= Autopoint Company =

U.S. manufacturer of pencils and desk top accessories

Autopoint Trademark

The Autopoint Company was a manufacturer of pencils and desk top accessories in Chicago for about 50 years from the 1920s to around 1970.

== History ==
Autopoint was founded by Frank C. Deli, Michael M. Kaufmann, and John P. Lynn around 1920. They used the name "Realite Pencil Company." They worked with Lawrence V. Redman of the Redmanol Company to develop techniques for molding plastic bodies for pencils. They took out several patents on plastic molds. The company continued to do business with Redmanol, and later with Bakelite Corporation after Redmanol had been merged into it.

In the early 1920s, they made a business alliance with Charles Keeran, who had been the founder of the Eversharp Pencil Company. Keeran had previously registered the trademark "Autopoint." Eventually, the company took the name Autopoint. The company continued to use the brand name "Realite" for its line of less expensive pencils until World War II.

Around 1925, the Bakelite Corporation gained a controlling interest in the Autopoint Company. Bakelite bought out founders Kaufmann and Lynn, and appointed a president who reported to Bakelite. Deli remained an officer of the Autopoint Company until his death in 1946. Bakelite did not integrate Autopoint into its organization but operated Autopoint as a separate company.

The Autopoint trademark (No. 125,149) was registered by Keeran on April 15, 1919. The trademark was used by the Autopoint Company in Chicago from the 1920s to the 1970s. It was later used by Autopoint, Inc., in Janesville, Wisconsin.

In 1951, the Cory Corporation, a Chicago company, bought Autopoint from Union Carbide which had acquired Bakelite in 1939. Cory operated Autopoint as a division appointing the president. In the 1950s, Julius Lederer served as president of Autopoint.

Autopoint was a job shop preparing advertising pencils for many different companies. In the 1950s and 1960s, their product line also included a number of other plastic desk accessories.

In the 1967, the Hershey Chocolate Corporation bought the Cory Corporation. A few years later, Hershey sold Autopoint to Gillette which merged it with its Papermate division. Gillette dismantled the Autopoint sales organization, sold the Autopoint plant in Chicago, sold or discontinued much of its product line, and greatly reduced the number of models of pencils produced. The pencils that Gillette continued to produce were reengineered to allow more interchangeability of parts between the different models of pencils.

Around 1980, Gillette sold the Autopoint name and machinery to produce Autopoint pencils to a group of business men from Janesville, Wisconsin. They founded Autopoint-Janesville Inc. which continued to manufacture and sell pencils and other products under the Autopoint brand. In 2013, the company was sold again, to Jason Bender, who continued selling Autopoint-branded pencils but began making pencils for Oregon-based Rite in the Rain, a manufacturer of waterproof notebooks as the "Model 99," with plain clips and screen-printed barrels.

Rite in the Rain negotiated a contract for the exclusive rights to distribute Autopoint products, although it is unclear whether a final agreement was reached. Rite in the Rain also considered purchasing the company outright, but decided the risk was too great when it became clear Autopoint was falling behind on its bills. In 2020, Autopoint defaulted in its rent payments for the company's factory, and in 2021 Autopoint's landlord proceeded with an eviction, giving Jason Bender until April 11, 2022 to sell the company and vacate the building. Bender failed to do so, abandoning all of the remaining machinery, stock, and parts at the Janesville plant. Autopoint's landlord contacted Jonathan Veley, a mechanical pencil enthusiast whose 2019 book, A Century of Autopoint, established him as the most likely person who might be interested in reviving the company.

Veley formed the Legendary Pencil Company, LLC, which acquired all of Autopoint's abandoned property including enough assembled components to manufacture thousands of pencils. The Legendary Pencil Company introduced 18 models based on the former "Jumbo" Autopoints in July 2022. engraved with vintage patterns using proprietary processes to create a more upscale product. Veley has plans to resume full-scale production.
