= Emma Kickapoo =

Native American artist model

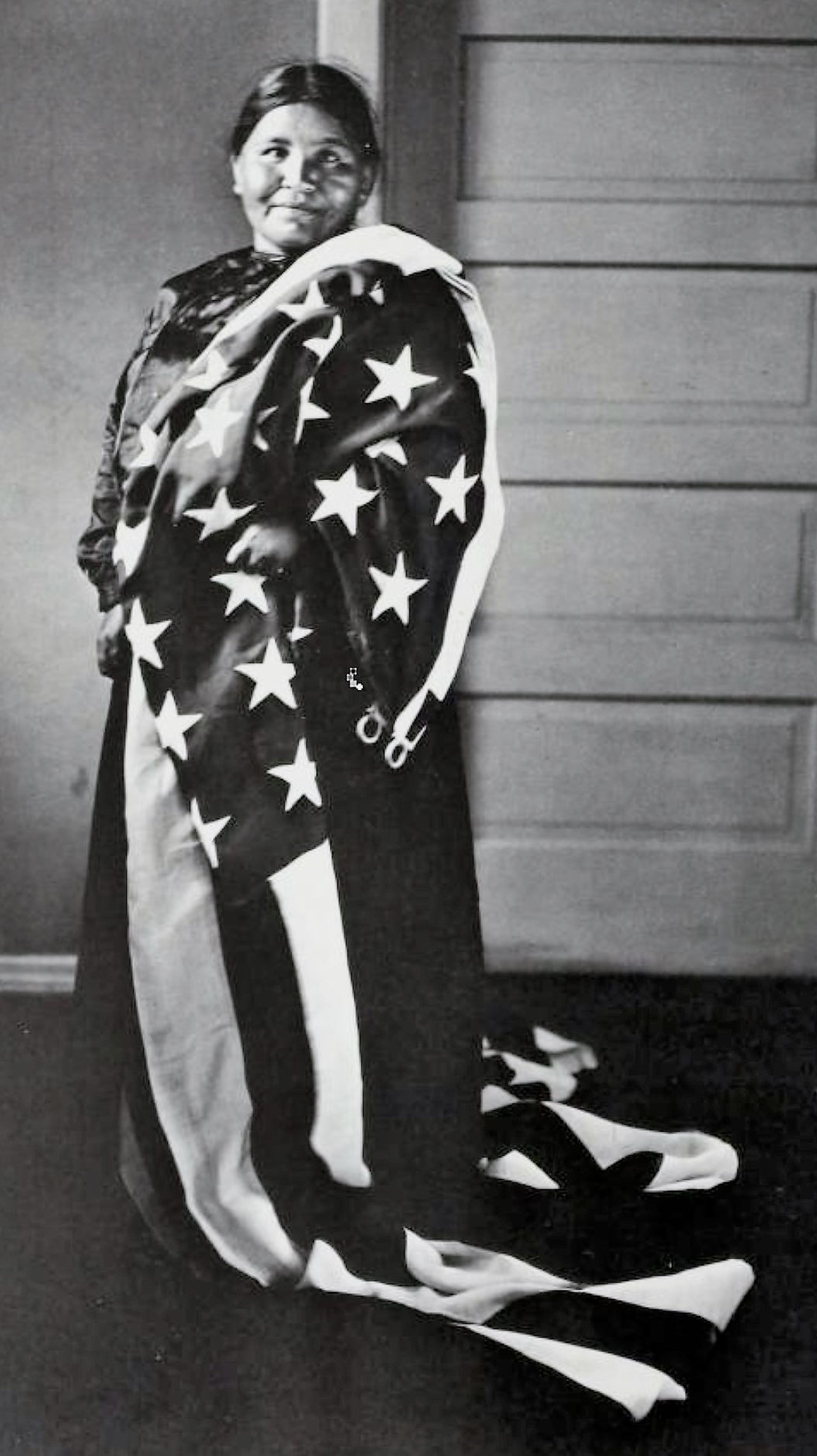
- Kickapoo in 1913
- Born: Pem-i-tha-ah-kwa, Pem-me-tha-ah-quah, or Pen-e-thah-ah-quah; June 1880; Kickapoo Reservation, Indian Territory
- Died: 1942 (aged 61–62); McLoud, Pottawatomie County, Oklahoma
- Other names: Emma Ellis, Emma Kickapoo Williams, Emma Kickapoo Williams Ellis
- Occupations: baker, artists' model, quiltmaker
- Years active: 1912–1932

Emma Kickapoo Williams Ellis (1880–1942) was a Native American woman of the Mexican Kickapoo, known as a model for several artists. She took an allotment in Indian Territory, was educated at the Carlisle Indian Industrial School, in Carlisle, Pennsylvania and became a baker. In 1912, she was one of three Kickapoo models for Edward Warren Sawyer, who made a bronze cast of her image for the Smithsonian. The following year, she was the sole tribal member willing to accept a United States Flag from the Wanamaker Expedition. Her image posing with it was chosen for the cover of the 1971 book American Indian Portraits from the Wanamaker Expedition of 1913, which published the photographic collection taken during the expedition. In 1931, she sent a photograph of herself and a quilt she made to Franklin D. Roosevelt, which was featured in volume 15 of the series Handbook of North American Indians published in 1978 by the Smithsonian.

== Early life and education ==
Pem-i-tha-ah-kwa, Pem-me-tha-ah-quah, or Pen-e-thah-ah-quah, (meaning flying past) was born probably in 1879 or 1880, on the Mexican Kickapoo Reservation in Indian Territory to parents who were from Mexico. (Note: Scholar Ellen Cordero Raimond gives the birth name as Pen-e-the-ah-quah, Charles Callender, Richard K. Pope, and Susan M.Pope, write it as Pemiθaahkwa and give her birth as ca. 1883. Carlisle's records indicate she was eighteen in 1898. The Mexican Kickapoo census records indicate that her name was Pem me tha ah quah and twenty-four years old in 1900 and Pem me thoh ah qua and twenty-five years old in 1901, indicating a birth around 1876. Both of her marriages indicate she was born around 1879.) The Kickapoo were originally an Algonquian-speaking people, who originated in Wisconsin. Pushed southward from conflict with other tribes and settlers, by the 1830s one group had settled in Kansas, while the larger traditional faction lived in camps and moved often, ranging from Missouri to western Arkansas, Oklahoma, and Texas. Conflicts escalated after the establishment in 1836 of the Republic of Texas and the American Civil War, forcing the majority of the Kickapoo south into Mexico, where they settled in the state of Coahuila. Negotiations began in the 1870s between the United States and Mexican governments to relocate the Kickapoo on a reservation in Indian Territory. An agency was created in 1874 and land set aside for the Kickapoo resettlement on the north fork of the Canadian River. An official reservation was established in 1882, on the Deep Fork Tributary of the Canadian River.

In 1895, the United States government allotted land to 283 tribal members, but the remaining two-thirds of the tribe returned to Mexico. Kickapoo was one of the members who took an allotment in Oklahoma. Her allotment number was W-43. She arrived at the Carlisle Indian Industrial School in Pennsylvania on November 23, 1898, as an eighteen year old and was given the name Emma Kickapoo. She completed her education in 1905 and returned to Indian Territory, where she first was employed as a domestic worker in the home of Thomas Wildcat Alford. In 1908, Kickapoo married Owen Loyd (or Lloyd) Williams in Hiawatha, Kansas. Loyd worked as an assistant farmer for the Shawnee Agency and Kickapoo worked as a baker there. Within two years she and Williams had a son, who they named Lloyd. (Note: The couple's son is shown in the 1910 newspaper clipping, but later records, like his school enrollment give a birth date of September 17, 1911.)

== Career ==
Edward Warren Sawyer an American artist working in Paris, visited the Kickapoo in 1912, on behalf of the Smithsonian Institution. Sawyer was most known for his medallions featuring Native people, which he had begun to capture in portraits on medals or in bronze casts from 1904. For his assignment with the Kickapoo, he chose three models, Ahu-ah-shin-nin-na, Much-a-nin-na, and Emma Kickapoo. After molding their likenesses in clay, the medallions were cast in bronze and reported by the newspaper to be easily recognizable renditions of the subjects. The pieces when completed were to be placed in the collections of the Smithsonian.

Rodman Wanamaker, a partner in Wanamaker's department store, sent his employee Joseph K. Dixon on the third North American Indian expedition in 1913, to distribute American flags to Native people. His purpose was to encourage Native citizenship in the country as a way to prevent the death of their cultures and reenact a ceremony which had recently been held at Fort Wadsworth on Staten Island, New York at the groundbreaking ceremony for a monument to honor Native people. When Dixon arrived at the Kickapoo agency, in Shawnee, Oklahoma, an interpreter explained the reason for the "Expedition of Citizenship" and the tribe refused to participate. Having signed many agreements in the past with the government, which had caused them regret, tribal officials based their reluctance on a lack of understanding of the purpose. They refused to sign a Declaration of Allegiance or accept a flag from Dixon. The sole tribal member willing to accept the flag was Kickapoo, and she was photographed draped in the flag. The photograph depicts her looking directly into the camera in a sparsely furnished room. A stout woman, Kickapoo, is dressed in a plain dark blouse, a full-length skirt, and over her left-shoulder is draped an American flag which cascades to the floor.

In 1917, Loyd died from appendicitis, leaving Kickapoo as a widow. Two years later, she was remarried to Frank Ellis, a member of the Absentee Shawnee Tribe of Indians. Frank was a house painter and building contractor. In the 1930s, Kickapoo was photographed in a series of images which depict her in more traditional clothing. One image shows her standing in front of a quilt featuring donkeys, the symbol of the Democratic Party of the United States. She is dressed in a "fine blue woolen robe with ribbon appliqué and silver adornments". The quilt was made during the first campaign of Franklin Delano Roosevelt. She wrote him a letter and enclosed the photograph, offering to send him the quilt, "Democratic Quilt" if he won the election.

== Death and legacy ==
Ellis died in 1942 in McLoud, Pottawatomie County, Oklahoma. In 1971, the photographs held in the collections of the American Museum of Natural History regarding the Wanamaker expedition were rediscovered. Working with a team to research and publish the images, the editor Charles R. Reynolds Jr. selected Ellis' image for the cover of the book American Indian Portraits from the Wanamaker Expedition of 1913. In 1978, a photograph of Ellis and her "Democratic Quilt", appeared in the Smithsonian's publication, Handbook of North American Indians, Volume 15. Some of her photographs are held in the Oklahoma Historical Society's Anna Wox Lewis Collection in Oklahoma, City. The 1913 photograph taken by the Wannamaker Expedition, served as inspiration for one of the pieces in artist Annu Palakunnathu Matthew's series An Indian from India, which compares the effect of imperialism upon Native Americans and South Asians. She adapted "American Indian Woman Wearing Flag" into a self-portrait, "Indian American Wearing Flag as Sari" (2003), to depict the struggle for her heritage to be accepted by her adoptive country and the hybrid nature of culture.
