= Wanamaker expeditions =

Visits to US native peoples, 1908–1913

The Wanamaker expeditions were a series of three journeys led by Joseph K. Dixon to various tribes of Native peoples living in the US in the early 20th century. The three expeditions were primarily sponsored by department store magnate Rodman Wanamaker.

== Background ==
The concept of sending an "expedition" to visit tribes originated with Joseph K. Dixon, an author and photographer. Rodman Wanamaker sponsored Dixon, who named the project "the Rodman Wanamaker Expeditions to the Indians". Dixon was the "educational director" (essentially a public relations worker) of Philadelphia department store Wanamaker's. Wanamaker's had been founded in 1876 by Rodman's father John Wanamaker. By the turn of the century, it had grown into a large store with several locations around the country. The company became known for offering a range of entertainment in addition to products. Historian Alan Trachtenberg notes that such stores in the early twentieth century were locations where people learned what it meant to be an American. Dixon was convinced such expeditions offered a great opportunity for the company and could be good for the nation as well. White Americans saw Native Americans as a vanishing race and became interested in their culture. Efforts were also made to "assimilate" Natives into white society. Dixon had fashioned himself as an authority on Native Americans.

== Expeditions ==
The first expedition went to Crow Agency, Montana, in 1908, and Dixon was accompanied by three photographers. It was endorsed by the Commissioner of Indian Affairs. Dixon carefully directed filming and photographs as he tried to capture authentic images without "any hint of the white man's foot". In reality these images were romanticized and commercialized presentations of Native American life. A film version of "The Song of Hiawatha" was recorded. Dixon cast actors in the roles through auditioning hundreds of people.

The following year A Wanamaker Primer on the North American Indians was published which suggested Natives had "Jewish blood in their veins", said "an Indian is always an Indian" and described them as "born to shirk tasks of toil". It describes a tragic but inevitable defeat of the Native Americans by white people.

Also in 1909 Dixon returned to Crow Agency where he directed around 100 Native chiefs to film "The Last Great Indian Council" and a reenactment of the Battle of the Little Bighorn. Dixon was also careful to document and record his photographing procedures.

=== Expedition for Citizenship ===
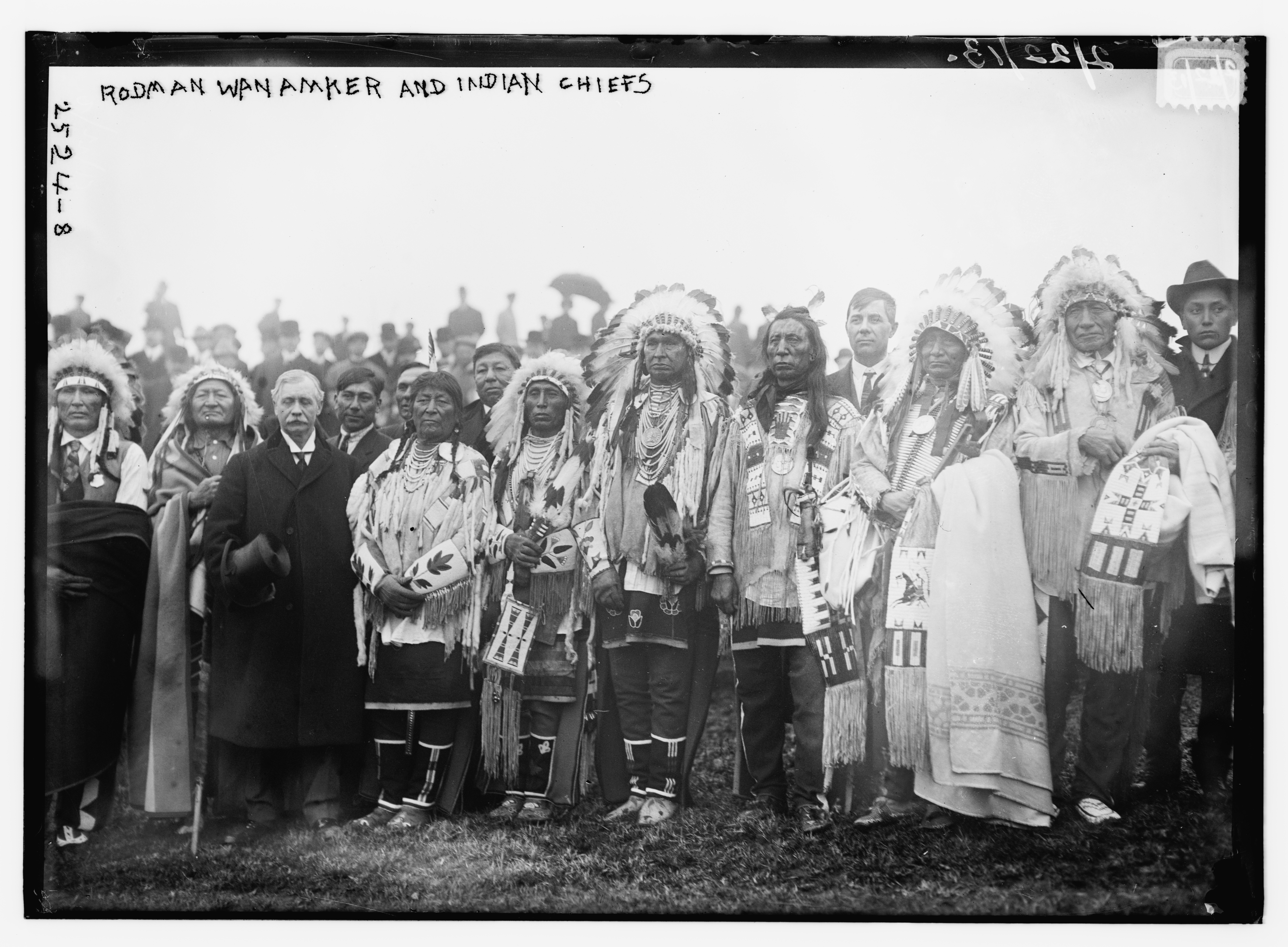
Indian Chiefs on February 22, 1913, at the groundbreaking ceremony for the National American Indian Memorial

In February 1913 ground was broken on a National American Indian Memorial. Upon Dixon's request, Franklin Knight Lane, the United States Secretary of the Interior, approved another expedition. In June that year, Dixon set out with his son, Rollin, another photographer, John Scott, James McLaughlin, and an employee of Eastman Kodak on an "expedition of citizenship" that was sponsored by Wanamaker's and the Pennsylvania Railroad, which provided a rail-car that had a darkroom, known as Signet. (Native Americans were not recognized as citizens at this time, and did not have this status until a decade later, with the Indian Citizenship Act of 1924).

It was also supported by Woodrow Wilson, William Howard Taft, and Thomas Edison. Funding was in part provided by a "Committee of One Hundred", which included wealthy Americans such as John D. Rockefeller and William Randolph Hearst. The expedition traveled 20,000–27,000 miles (32,000–43,000 km) by rail in around six months and visited 89 tribes. It raised an American flag in a ceremony everywhere it went and gifted every reservation an American flag. Additionally, the expedition had a "Declaration of Allegiance" for Natives to sign and recordings of the Commissioner of Indian Affairs and the President of the United States speaking. Not all tribes welcomed the Americans, notably the Hopi, Pueblo, and Navajo peoples.

== Results and legacy ==
Dixon felt his "expedition of citizenship" heralded the beginning of "a new epoch" in Native American history. His filmography presented Native Americans as a vanishing race.

The expeditions produced thousands of photographs (4600 from the first two), published in The Vanishing Race and other formats, and about 50 miles (80 km) of film that were developed into several films, including The Song of Hiawatha ("The Song of Hiawatha" developed into a movie), and The Romance of a Vanishing Race. Wanamaker later gave over three hundred lectures to over four hundred thousand people on The Song of Hiawatha. The Vanishing Race remained in publication for over sixty years.

At the Panama–Pacific International Exposition the exhibitions' photographs were awarded with a gold prize. James McLaughlin accompanied the 1913 exhibition and criticized Dixon's methods as only seeking publicity. A contemporary article in the Society of American Indians's Quarterly Journal called Dixon's expeditions "the great advertising hoax". The 1913 expedition did lead to increased public support for Native American citizenship, and some tribes welcomed Dixon's visit.

== Reception ==
The historian Russel Lawrence Barsh deemed the expedition "an American Heart of Darkness" and compared the two works by noting how Dixon, "a single troubled and mysterious man, [... used his connections] to impose his romantic fantasies on every Indian tribe in the United States." Barsh continues to argue that "[l]ike one of [Joseph] Conrad's protagonists, he was thrust deeper into his ambivalence by his own apparent triumph, as he slowly realized that he had become just one more deceiver and victimizer of the people he had intended to save." The scholar Richard Lindstrom described Dixon's actions as furthering an "idealized and distorted understanding of a vanishing 'Indian race'". Lindstrom also analyzed Native responses to the third expedition.

In 1998, Trachtenberg described the expeditions as "all but forgotten, abandoned to fragmentary records scattered among several archives". He goes on to write that "In Dixon's work the theme of the 'vanishing race' achieves its most elaborate rhetorical expression in the early twentieth century." Trachtenberg considers the expeditions to be an example of Americans asking "who is and who might be American?" He notes that the expeditions took place during a period of high nativist sentiment against non-Anglo-Saxons, and broader concerns about what the America identity was. To Trachtenberg, Dixon conceived and executed the expeditions as a "product", designed to provide a comfortable narrative to white people.

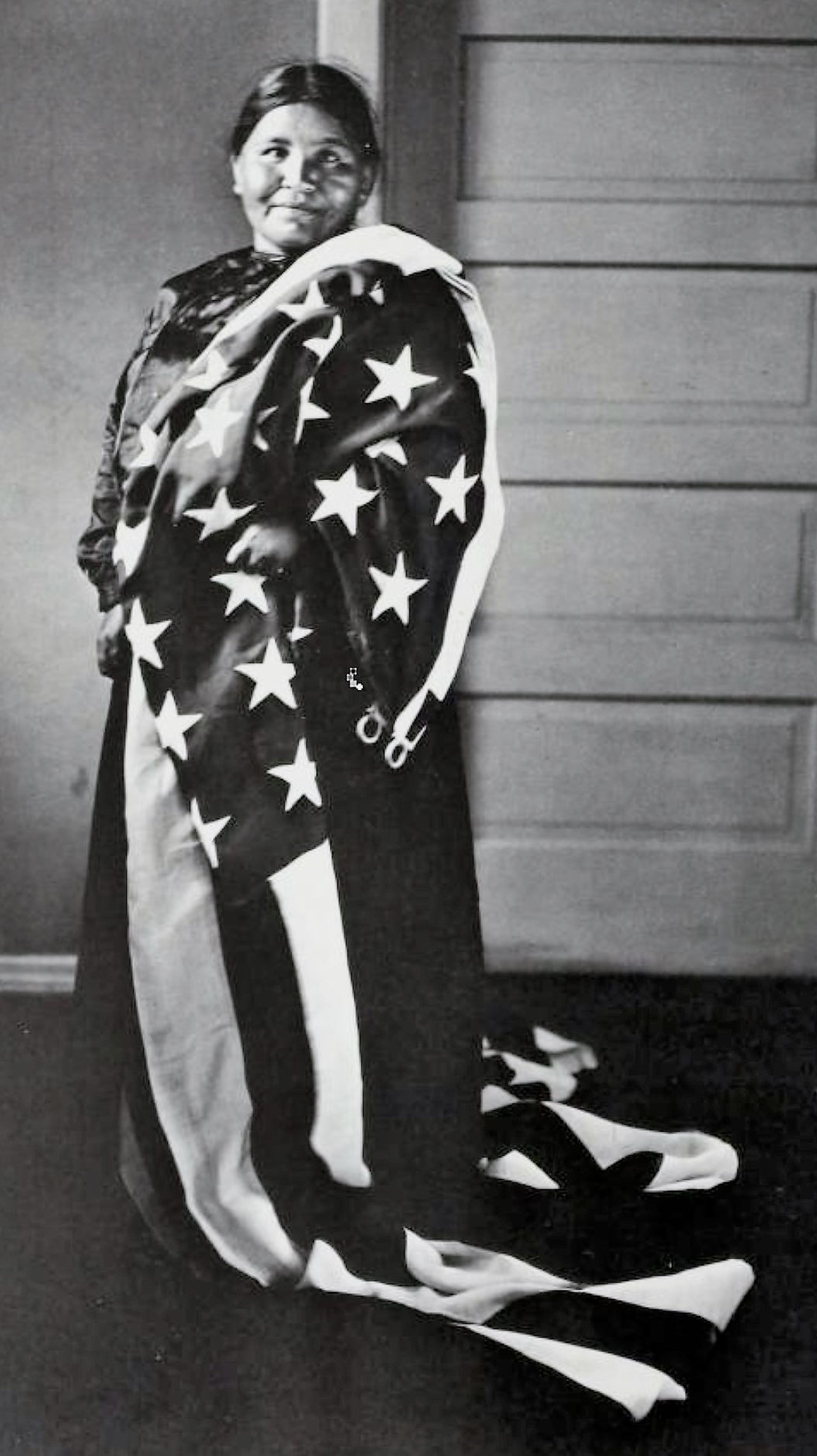
Cover of American Indian portraits; from the Wanamaker expedition of 1913, depicting Emma Kickapoo

In 1971, the photographs of the 1913 expedition were rediscovered in the collections of the American Museum of Natural History. A team of researchers worked to identify the people in the photographs and prepare them for publication. Charles R. Reynolds Jr., edited the book American Indian Portraits from the Wanamaker Expedition of 1913, which resulted from their analysis. A photograph of Emma Kickapoo was selected to appear on the cover of the book.

In 2018, the documentary film Dixon-Wanamaker Expedition To Crow Agency (1908) was selected for preservation in the National Film Registry by the Library of Congress as "culturally, historically, or aesthetically significant".

== Bibliography ==
- Trachtenberg, Alan (1998). "Wanamaker Indians". The Yale Review. 86 (2): 1–24. doi:10.1111/0044-0124.00208.
- Barsh, Russel (1993-01-01). "An American Heart of Darkness: The 1913 Expedition for American Indian Citizenship". Great Plains Quarterly.
- Lindstrom, Richard (1996). ""Not from the Land Side, but from the Flag Side": Native American Responses to the Wanamaker Expedition of 1913". Journal of Social History. 30 (1): 209–227. doi:10.1353/jsh/30.1.209. ISSN 0022-4529. JSTOR 3789755.
