= National American Indian Memorial =

Proposed monument in New York City

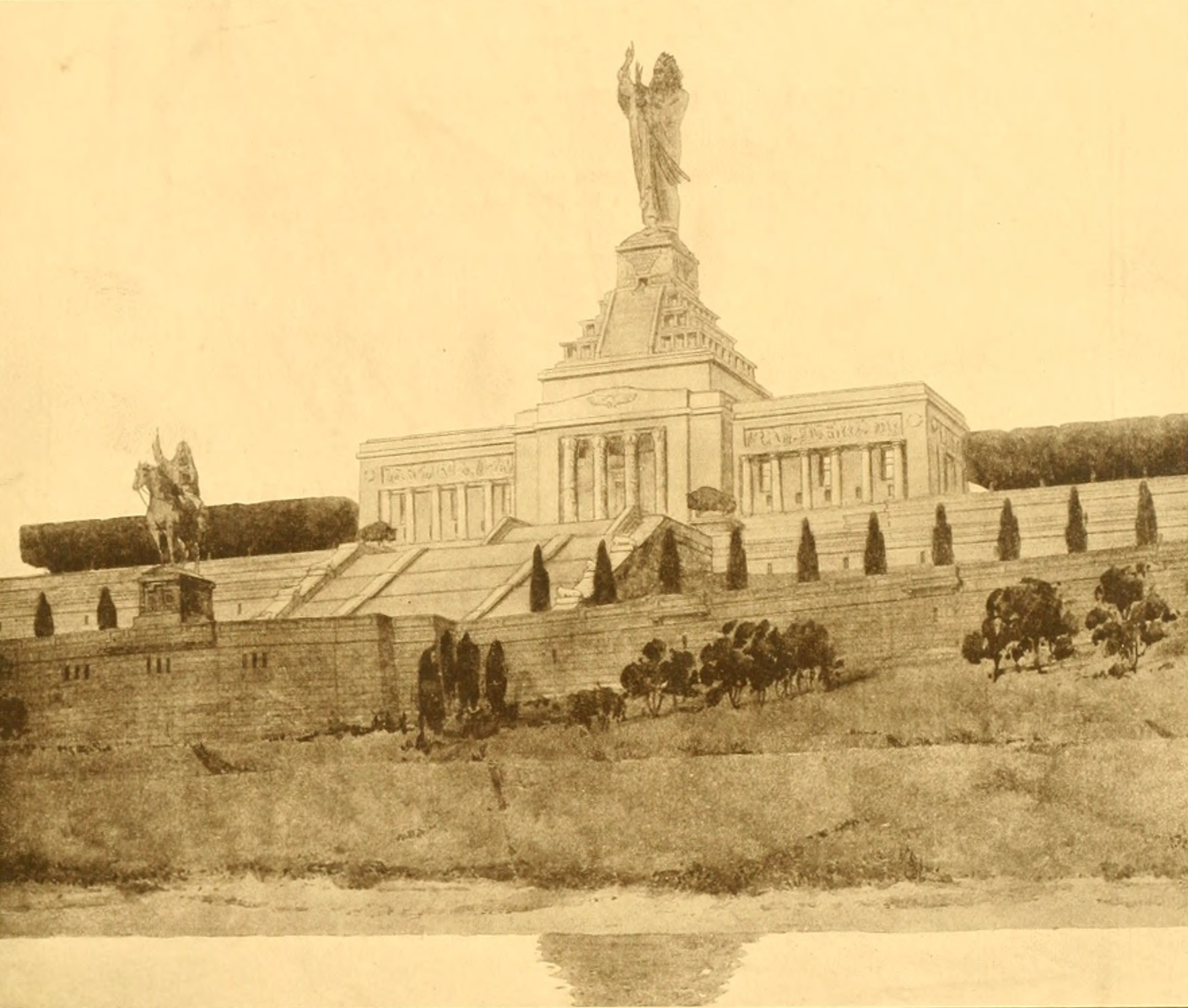
Detail of drawing from cover of the groundbreaking ceremony's program. This was not intended as a formal design.

The National American Indian Memorial or North American Indian Memorial was a proposed monument to Native Americans to be erected on a bluff overlooking the Narrows, the main entrance to New York Harbor. The major part of the memorial was to be a 165-foot-tall (50 m) statue of a representative American Indian warrior atop a substantial foundation building housing a museum of native cultures, similar in scale to, but higher than, the Statue of Liberty several miles to the north. Ground was broken to begin construction in 1913 but the project was never completed and no physical trace remains today.

The proposal was associated with the Wanamaker expeditions of that era, and the concept of memorializing the "Vanishing Indian".

== Background ==
In 1908 and 1909, Joseph K. Dixon led two 'expeditions', sponsored by Rodman Wanamaker, wealthy from his involvement with the department store Wanamaker's, to visit Native American tribes as part of increasing white American interest in Native culture and efforts to "assimilate" the tribes into white American society. The first expedition, which travelled to Crow Agency, Montana, in 1908, saw Dixon carefully direct filming and photographs in an effort to capture authentic images without "any hint of the white man's foot". The following year Dixon returned to Crow Agency where directed around 100 Native chiefs to film "The Last Great Indian Council" and a reenactment of the Battle of the Little Bighorn.

== Concept ==
In on May 12, 1909, shortly after the second expedition ended, a dinner was held at the New York City restaurant Sherry's to honor Buffalo Bill Cody, whose performance was being held in the New York Hippodrome. Over one hundred people attended, including Nelson A. Miles, an American general, and Frederic Remington, an artist. At the dinner, Cody proposed a giant Native American statue—which Wanamaker had suggested to him, that would be set on the shore of New York Harbor. He suggested that it would be "as large" as the Statue of Liberty and would serve to welcome "everyone to this shore." Many guests at the dinner party enthusiastically supported the idea, with Miles saying he was "gratified that there is now a feeling of generosity and respect towards the departing race". The public also met the proposal with general support. In June 1909 the President of the United States, William Howard Taft, received a letter from Wanamaker (historian Alan Trachtenberg theorizes Dixon wrote it) asking for his endorsement of the memorial. A 1910 conception foresaw a Peace Memorial or Great Bronze Column of Staten Island, sitting 580 feet (180 m) above Pavilion Hill in St. George and Tompkinsville, Staten Island on city-donated land (40.637°N 74.08°W) and functioning as a Western Hemisphere counterpart to The Hague's Peace Palace.

There were varied motivations behind this memorial. Historian Russel Barsh wrote in 1993 that many Americans viewed it as "a celebration of victory" over Native Americans, while others considered it "a constant reminder of the vanishing race to whom we are indebted for the great, free gift of a continent," and some thought the monument would memorialize admirable qualities attributed to Natives and serve as a "lasting beacon of American ideals". Arizona John Burke, who managed Cody, announced that America owed "at least an apology for the exigencies of civilized man and his cupidity in appropriating the red man's land" though he later clarified that "of course, it was all done in the name of progress, and God had foreordained that it should be so, but let us build this monument as a lasting tribute to a dying race and to the genius of the man who suggested it."

The bow and arrow, with the left hand hanging entirely at full length, indicates that he is through with his war weaponry; the uplifted hand, with the two fingers extended toward the open sea, is the universal peace sign of the Indian. Thus he gives, in bronze, a perpetual welcome to the nations of the world, as he gave welcome to the white man when he first came to these shores.

— Joseph K. Dixon

Dixon became heavily involved advocating for the monument. He envisioned a major lasting that would be "another WORLD-WONDER", proposing a 60 feet (18 m) tall bronze statue of a Native American warrior, bringing the monument's full height to 165 feet (50 m), or 15 feet (4.6 m) above the Statue of Liberty. Dixon wrote that "it must be the most compelling statue in the world." While he excluded Natives themselves from all planning, he was in contact with several. He formally consulted the Improved Order of Red Men, which actually had no native members. In 1911 Wanamaker founded the National American Indian Memorial Association (NAIMA) for the purpose of constructing the monument. Miles suggested a group of statues for the monument.

== Location ==
Wanamaker had originally proposed Fort Lafayette as a site, and for a time Shore Road in Bay Ridge, Brooklyn was also considered, but in March 1910 Leonard Wood, a general in the US Army, suggested Fort Wadsworth. By April 18, 1912, this had been set as the location. The memorial was to be erected on the site of Fort Tompkins on Staten Island, New York. Fort Tompkins, a component of the larger Fort Wadsworth, is located on a bluff high above the west side of the Narrows. It was and still is owned by the federal government. Virtually all ocean-going ships destined for New York pass the site, so the monument would have been highly visible to visitors, seen well before the Statue of Liberty would come into view.

On December 8, 1911, the United States Congress formally authorized the use of federal land for the monument, though Wanamaker would be responsible for providing funding. The land was to be decided upon by the US Secretary of War and US Secretary of the Navy. The bill had been introduced by Taft.

== Groundbreaking ==
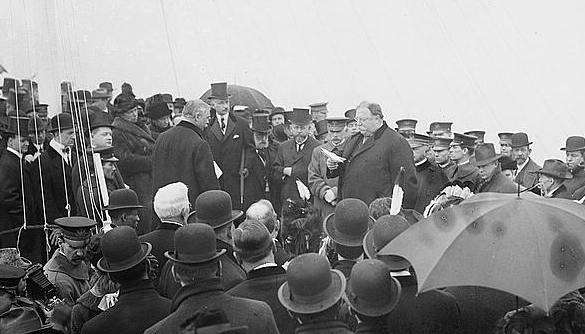
William Howard Taft at the Memorial's groundbreaking

A "Committee of One Hundred" prominent American citizens was organized in support of the monument, with members such as Theodore Roosevelt, Franklin D. Roosevelt, Cornelius Vanderbilt, J. P. Morgan, Andrew Carnegie, John D. Rockefeller, William Randolph Hearst, Henry Clay Frick, and Ralph Pulitzer. This group, as well as the Improved Order, offered help fundraising.

It was decided in early 1912 that the memorial would be designed by a sculptor, an architect, and a landscape architect. A $250 contest in 1910 for the contest had produced no credible results. The sculptor Cyrus Edwin Dallin offered to design the sculpture, though he was not selected. After Burnham & Company turned Dixon's request for design help down, the architects Thomas Hastings and Daniel Chester French agreed to handle it, though they were members of the United States Commission of Fine Arts, which would be responsible for selecting and approving the final design. The two later withdrew over allegations of impropriety. They produced a preliminary sketch, though not a formal design. A brochure from the dedication also spoke of a museum of Native culture under the statue. Some criticized the memorial, including the architect Charles Moore, also a member of the Commission of Fine Arts, who described it as an "ungainly Indian on the roof of a Greek temple".

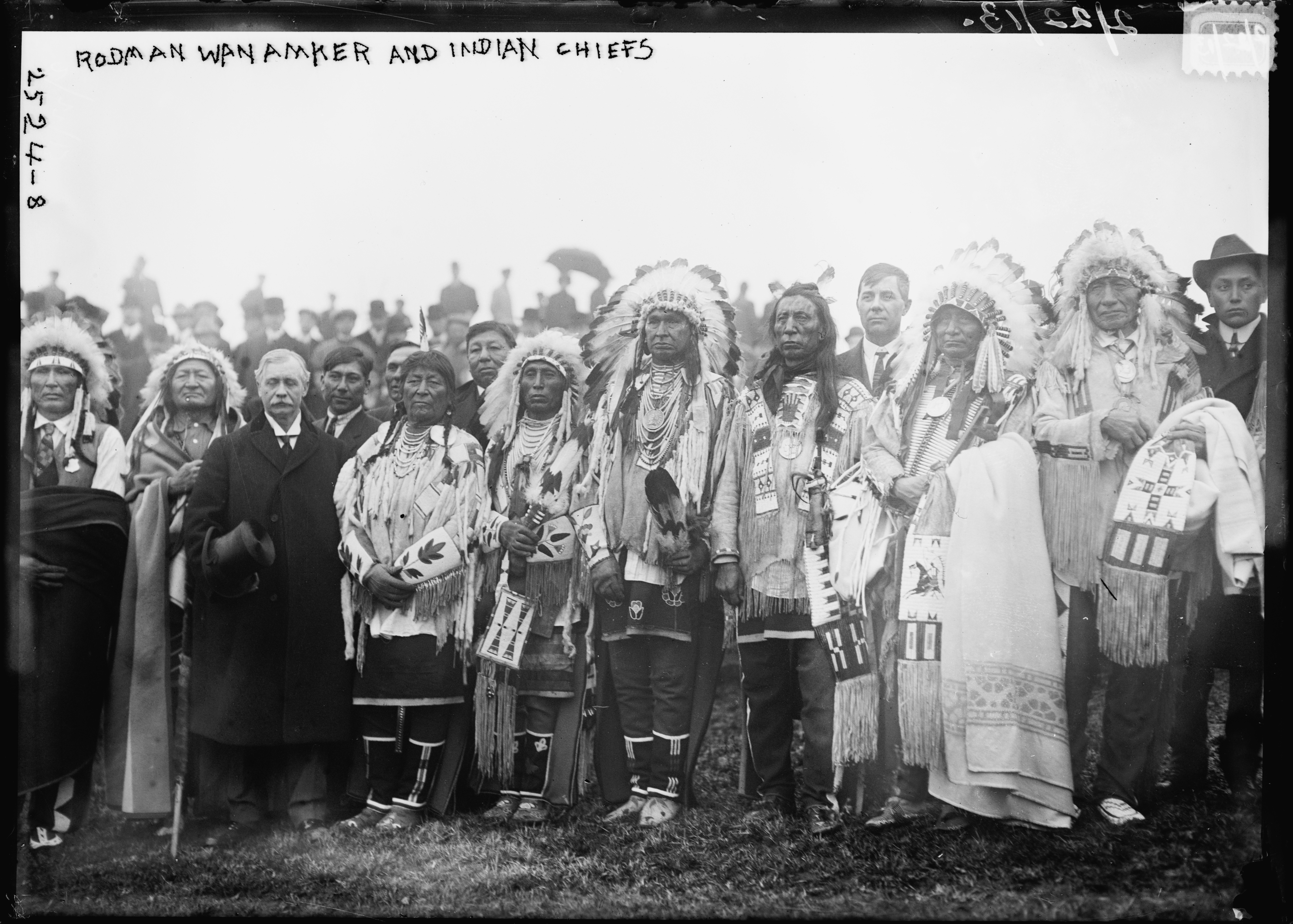
Indigenous Chiefs on February 22, 1913 at the groundbreaking ceremony for the National American Indian Memorial

In 1911, the United States Congress had approved the monument to be built on federal land, but groundbreaking did not take place on February 22, 1913, Washington's Birthday, at the old Fort Tompkins on Staten Island. Dixon carefully arranged the ceremony, getting William Howard Taft, the current president of the United States, to agree to come, as well as "thirty of the most famous Chiefs from the Indian Reservations". These thirty were carefully selected to conform to white stereotypes of Natives, and Dixon placed great emphasis on having them wearing traditional clothing. Dixon advertised that the natives had fought at the Battle of the Little Bighorn in 1876, though only one actually did. Similarly, the natives came from seven reservations but Dixon inflated the total to "nearly every tribe in the nation".

The Native group visited F. H. Abbott, the acting Commissioner of Indian Affairs, and James McLaughlin, a worker with the department, in Washington, D.C. The delegation was "supervised" by McLaughlin and upon Abbott's suggestion they developed three speeches pledging allegiance to the United States to present at the groundbreaking. Abbott combined the three into a final pledge.

The actual groundbreaking ceremony was grey and rainy. Though hundreds were in attendance, Thomas L. Sloan was the only Native American in addition to the chiefs. Taft was greeted with a 21-gun salute and spent an hour there, giving a brief speech and digging first with a silver spade and later with a Native stone axe. Other politicians in attendance included members of Taft's cabinet and the Mayor of New York City and the governor of New York State. Shortly after Chief Wooden Leg, who was in the Native delegation, began digging with a buffalo thigh bone. They then raised an American flag while Irving Morgan's "The Indian's Requiem" was playing. the declaration of allegiance was signed, and 27-33 Buffalo nickels were distributed for the first time by George Frederick Kunz.

The delegation toured New York City the following day.

== Efforts and failure ==
Shortly after the ceremony Dixon went on a third expedition. Although he continued to heavily advocate for the memorial, returning to the Fort Wadsworth groundbreaking site in 1914 for the New York Commercial Tercentenary, exhibiting photographs at the Panama–Pacific International Exposition in 1915 and giving lectures to an estimated million people, he gained support but little money. A total of $143.10 was raised for the memorial. Wanamaker was unwilling to provide funding, and the project was overshadowed by the American entry into World War I. A giant bronze statue was also impractical because of a bronze shortage brought about by the war. Dixon and the NAIMA later advocated for all-Native American cavalry regiments and later for Native American citizenship. The press had also begun to deem the project a "philanthropic humbug".

A bronze tablet from 1913 disappeared. Discussion in 1936 as a Works Progress Administration project led to no tangible result, as did a proposal in the 1940s. A 2012 proposal by Margaret and Robert Boldeagle for a much-reduced version of the monument garnered support from local politicians Andrew Lanza and Louis Tobacco, as well as a supportive editorial in the Staten Island Advance. In 2017, the monument was included in "Never Built New York", an exhibition at the Queens Museum that profiled unbuilt proposals for building in New York City.

In 1914, actor and activist Chauncey Yellow Robe condemned the project, stating:

We see a monument of the Indian in New York harbor as a memorial of his vanishing race. The Indian wants no such memorial monument, for he is not yet dead. The name of the North American Indian will not be forgotten as long as the rivers flow and the hills and mountains shall stand, and though we have progressed, we have not vanished.

== See also ==
- Native Americans in popular culture
- Indian removal
- Dignity (statue), a 2016 South Dakota statue well-received by the Native community

== Bibliography ==
- Barsh, Russel (1993-01-01). "An American Heart of Darkness: The 1913 Expedition for American Indian Citizenship". Great Plains Quarterly.
- Keune, Manfred E. (December 1978). "An Immodest Proposal: A Memorial to the North American Indian". The Journal of American Culture. 1 (4): 766–786. doi:10.1111/j.1542-734X.1978.0104_766.x. ISSN 1542-7331.
- Leahy, Todd (2008). Historical dictionary of Native American movements. Lanham, Maryland: Scarecrow Press. ISBN 978-0-8108-5773-5.
- Lindstrom, Richard (1996). ""Not from the Land Side, but from the Flag Side": Native American Responses to the Wanamaker Expedition of 1913". Journal of Social History. 30 (1): 209–227. doi:10.1353/jsh/30.1.209. ISSN 0022-4529. JSTOR 3789755.
- Trachtenberg, Alan (1998). "Wanamaker Indians". The Yale Review. 86 (2): 1–24. doi:10.1111/0044-0124.00208.
- Trachtenberg, Alan (2004). Shades of Hiawatha : staging Indians, making Americans, 1880-1930. New York: Hill and Wang. ISBN 978-0-374-29975-0.
