= WOO (Philadelphia) =

1920s Philadelphia radio station

WOO was an AM band radio station, which was operated by the Wanamaker Department Store in Philadelphia, Pennsylvania, from early 1922 until mid-1928.

== History ==
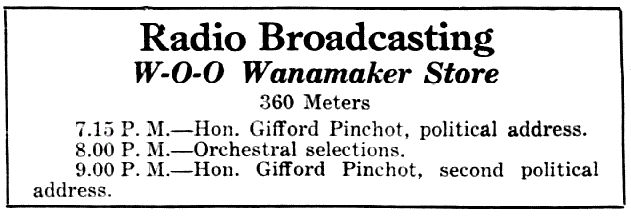
WOO made its debut broadcast on the evening of April 24, 1922.

WOO was first licensed to John Wanamaker on March 18, 1922. The station broadcast from a sound-proof room on the 2nd floor of the Wanamaker Department Store, adjacent to the Egyptian Hall, with the transmitter located on the 11th floor. (Six days later, a second Wanamaker station, WWZ, was licensed to the New York City store.) (Note: The floors have since been renumbered, as the old 1st Floor was the first floor above the Main Floor, etc. The studio was on the present Third Floor.)

At this time Wanamaker's already had extensive experience in radio, although primarily in point-to-point communication by Morse code rather than broadcasting. In 1911 American Marconi began operating two stations located at the Wanamaker stores in Philadelphia (WHE) and New York City (WHI). Previously Marconi had exclusively operated maritime and ship-to-shore facilities, and these were its first overland installations. The stations were used for Wanamaker's inter-company communication, and were also open to the general public, for sending telegrams between the two cities, in addition to ships along the Atlantic coast. In 1914 the New York station was used to conduct radiotelephone experiments, however the two stations never engaged in general broadcasting, and were operated separately from the later broadcasting stations, WOO in Philadelphia and WWZ in New York City.

On December 1, 1921, the U.S. Department of Commerce, in charge of radio at the time, adopted a regulation formally establishing a broadcasting station category, which set aside the wavelength of 360 meters (833 kHz) for entertainment broadcasts, and 485 meters (619 kHz) for market and weather reports. Some of the earliest radio stations were operated by department stores, used to promote the sale of radio receivers. Wanamaker's WOO was one of four Philadelphia department store stations established in the first half of 1922.

WOO made its debut broadcast on April 24, 1922, which featured two speeches by Gifford Pinchot, who was conducting an ultimately successful gubernatorial campaign, that were separated by a one hour program of "orchestral selections". The next day the Philadelphia Inquirer commented favorably on the Pinchot speeches, stating: "Although the only thing his eyes could see was the box into which he spoke, he visualized the thousands to whom he spoke and put punch and power into every telling point. His voice has excellent carrying quality and telephone messages received during the night told how clearly every word was heard."

WOO was originally licensed for operation on the 360 meter "entertainment" wavelength, in a timesharing arrangement with the other local stations. Within a few months it was authorized to also transmit on the 485 meter "market and weather report" wavelength. In late September 1922 the Department of Commerce set aside a second entertainment wavelength, 400 meters (750 kHz) for "Class B" stations that had quality equipment and programming, and WOO was assigned use of this more exclusive wavelength. In May 1923 additional "Class B" frequencies were made available, and one of the Philadelphia allocations, 590 kHz, was assigned to WOO and WIP on a timesharing basis.

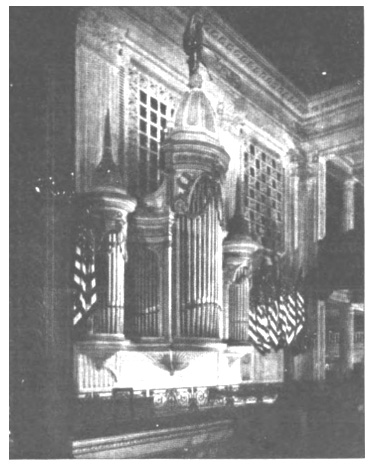
"The Organ at WOO" (1922)

WOO was most famous for its broadcasts of Wanamaker Organ ("The World's Greatest Organ") concerts. Its early schedule also included retransmissions of Naval Observatory time signals sent from station NAA in Arlington, Virginia. In 1925 it was one of the stations linked up to a national network that broadcast Calvin Coolidge's inauguration, the first radio broadcast of a presidential inauguration. A store booklet sent to listeners-in titled Broadcasting the World's Greatest Organ reported that "Wanamaker radio organ parties are given in homes in Porto Rico on broadcasting evenings; the great instrument has been heard in Berkeley, California; it is a delight to “listeners in” in trading posts along Hudson’s Bay...."

Wanamaker's eventually determined that the cost of running a radio station exceeded its benefits. The New York City station, WWZ, was shut down in the fall of 1923. Rodman Wanamaker died in March 1928, with his will placing the affairs of the store in the hands of a board of directors. It was then announced that as of June 1, 1928, WOO was also suspending operations. Station manager Charles Dryden released a statement noting that: "Investigations made by special inquiry among radio listeners during the past two years have revealed that broadcasting is not helping the store in general or in an advertising way, hence our decision to discontinue operations indefinitely." He also noted that: "However, we will, by actually stopping broadcasting, be able to determine by test if the public is in favor of our return to the air. Our equipment and installation will remain intact for the present." Because WOO had not yet been officially deleted, on November 11, 1928, it was reassigned to 1500 kHz as a low-powered "local" station, sharing time with Philadelphia-area stations WALK, WPSW and WHBW, as part of a major reallocation implemented by the Federal Radio Commission's General Order 40. However, the station never resumed operations, and it was formally deleted on February 20, 1929.

== See also ==
- List of initial AM-band station grants in the United States
