= S. Karpen & Bros. =

American furniture company

S. Karpen & Bros
- Type: Private company
- Industry: Furniture
- Founded: 1880
- Founder: Solomon Karpen
- Defunct: 1951
- Fate: Closed
- Headquarters: Chicago, United States
- Products: Upholstered furniture

S. Karpen & Bros. was a Chicago-based furniture manufacturing firm that specialized in upholstered furniture that operated from 1880 until 1951.

== History ==
The firm was established in 1880 under the leadership of Solomon Karpen. Samuel's eight brothers also participated in the firm. One brother, Michael Karpen, established a West Coast branch of the firm, "S. Karpen Brothers of California," in Huntington Park, California, in 1932.

In 1913, the firm backed Lawrence V. Redman in the establishment of the Redmanol Chemical Products Company. When the Redmanol company was absorbed into the Bakelite Corporation they retained an interest in the new company.

The company closed in 1951.
