= Eversharp =

American mechanical pencil and pen company (1913–1957)

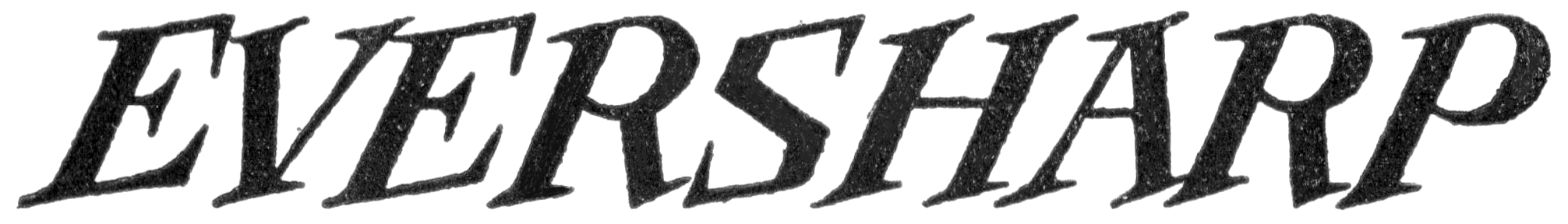
- Formerly: Keeran & Co. (1914); Wahl-Eversharp
- Type: Private
- Industry: Writing implements
- Founded: 1913
- Founder: Charles Rood Keeran
- Defunct: 1957; 69 years ago
- Fate: Company acquired by Wahl in 1916, becoming "Wahl-Eversharp", then merged to Parker in 1957
- Headquarters: Chicago, United States
- Products: Mechanical pencils; Fountain pens

Eversharp is an American brand of writing implements founded by Charles Rood Keeran in 1913 and marketed by Keeran & Co., based in Chicago. Keeran commercialized Eversharp mechanical pencils (manufactured by two companies, Heath and Wahl), then expanding to fountain pens when the company was acquired by the Wahl Adding Machine Co. in 1916 and it was named "Wahl-Eversharp". The company continued until 1957 when it was acquired by Parker Pen, which continued to use the Eversharp brand for a time.

Keeran is considered a pioneer maker of mechanical pencils, as the inventor of the first successful one.

== History ==
Charles Rood Keeran, a native of Bloomington, Illinois, had worked for the Bloomington Pickle Co. in his 20s. Around 1911 he partnered with J.F. Funk to manufacture White Crown Mason jar lids, though his attention soon turned to mechanical pencils. Keeran's earliest patent on a pencil dates to October 10, 1913. He was granted US patent 1,130,741 on March 9, 1915. The first production of Eversharp pencils was made in New Jersey by the "Heath Corporation", a prominent provider of high quality metalwork to the writing equipment industry. These pencils were test-marketed over the holiday season of 1913 at Wanamaker's in New York City. Keeran returned to Bloomington sometime in 1914 and established "Keeran & Co.", selling Heath-manufactured pencils. Those pencils had a .046 inches (1.2 mm) lead, which became the industry standard for thin mechanical pencil lead (although today the most popular sizes are 0.5 mm and 0.7 mm).

"On my way home on the train I had time to study it carefully... the thing that impressed me about it was the crudeness of the device ... I realized that the public was willing to pay from $3.50 to $5 for a good fountain pen and I could see no reason why they wouldn't pay as much for a fine pencil."

— Keeran about a pencil he purchased during a visit to Chicago in 1913.

In October 1915, Keeran relocated operations in Chicago, then signed a contract with the "Wahl Adding Machine Company" of Chicago to manufacture Eversharp-branded pencils. In mid-November 1915 Wahl took control of Eversharp in exchange for a capital infusion of $20,000. At the end of 1916, Eversharp was wholly absorbed by Wahl through an exchange of stock. Keeran retained a small stake in the combined firm and held the position of sales manager, but by the end of 1917 Keeran had been squeezed out of the company.

The Eversharp pencil was a huge success. By 1921 over 12 million had been sold. It allowed Wahl to become one of the leading manufacturers of pencils and eventually pens. Wahl's entry into the fountain pen business in 1917 was also facilitated by Charles Keeran, through purchase of the Boston Fountain Pen Company. Initially the "Wahl" brand name was used for pens and the "Eversharp" brand name for pencils, until at the end of the 1920s, the company renamed itself "Wahl-Eversharp", and all products, were branded accordingly. In 1941 the company renamed itself to "Eversharp". It remained a major player throughout the 1940s, but a series of missteps in its attempts to enter the then-new field of ballpoint pens hurt the company badly. In 1957 the Parker Pen Company acquired Eversharp. The Eversharp brand name continued to be used for a few years, but the production of Eversharp pens and pencils was stopped. Until 1999 the "Eversharp" brand name was still used for accessories such as refills, not only for legacy "Eversharp" products, but also suitable for products by many other companies.

Beginning in 2004, Syd Saperstein in the United States and Emmanuel Caltagirone in Italy attempted to revive the "Wahl-Eversharp" brand, working independently at first, then joining efforts. In 2012, they secured abandonments of the original "Wahl" and "Eversharp" trademarks and filed new trademarks for a new venture, reviving the brand name as the "Wahl-Eversharp Company", a wholly owned subsidiary of Pensbury Manor LLC, an Arizona corporation.

Today the company produces modern fountain pens based on original patented designs of Wahl and Eversharp.

== Patents ==
- U.S. patent 1,130,741 New and useful Improvements in Lead-Pencils and #1151016, and #1153115

== Bibliography ==
- The pencil: a history of design and circumstance, by Henry Petroski, Knopf, 1992. ISBN 0-679-73415-5, pp 265–270.
