= Charles Rood Keeran =

American inventor (1883–1948)

Charles Rood Keeran circa 1910-1920

Charles Rood Keeran (April 16, 1883 – June 9, 1948) was an Illinois inventor and businessman.

== Biography ==
He was born on April 16, 1883, on a farm near Bloomington, Illinois. Having an inventive father, William Lee Keeran, C.R. Keeran grew up with a creative spirit. After achieving a master's degree in engineering, he soon began patenting his ideas (circa 1906) which continued throughout his lifetime:

Keeran's 2-piece vacuum seal for Mason jars, which became the standard for home-canning, was immediately popular. However, he sold off his company, White Crown Fruit Jar, in order to finance his favorite invention: the Eversharp mechanical pencil. Around 1914, Keeran invented the basic mechanism for the Eversharp, thought up the "Eversharp" trademark (inspired by the Winchester Rifle logo), and set up a company to make and sell Eversharp pencils. He relocated to Evanston, Illinois, and entered into a business alliance with the Wahl Adding Machine Company in Chicago. Wahl officers obtained a majority share in the Eversharp Pencil Company and, in 1917, forced Keeran out of the company.

In 1919, Keeran registered the "Autopoint" trademark. In 1921, Keeran joined three businessmen in the Realite Pencil Company. Keeran brought the Autopoint name with him. Within a few years the company was renamed, the Autopoint Company.

Keeran felt that his invention and suggestions during his association with Wahl were the basis of their prosperity. For years, he fought a battle to get just compensation from the Wahl Company. He got no satisfaction.

He died on June 9, 1948, in Chicago, Illinois.

== Patents ==
- U.S. patent 877,435 New and useful Improvements in Detachable Spouts
- U.S. patent 925,345 New and useful Improvements in Switch and Detector-Bar Throwing Mechanism
- U.S. patent 1,111,905 Certain New and useful Improvements in Weapons
- U.S. patent 973,512 Certain New and useful Improvements in Receptacle-Closures and #1130611, #1167306, #1180929, #1207560, and #1226532
- U.S. patent 1,130,741 New and useful Improvements in Lead-Pencils and #1151016, and #1153115
