= Cory Corporation =

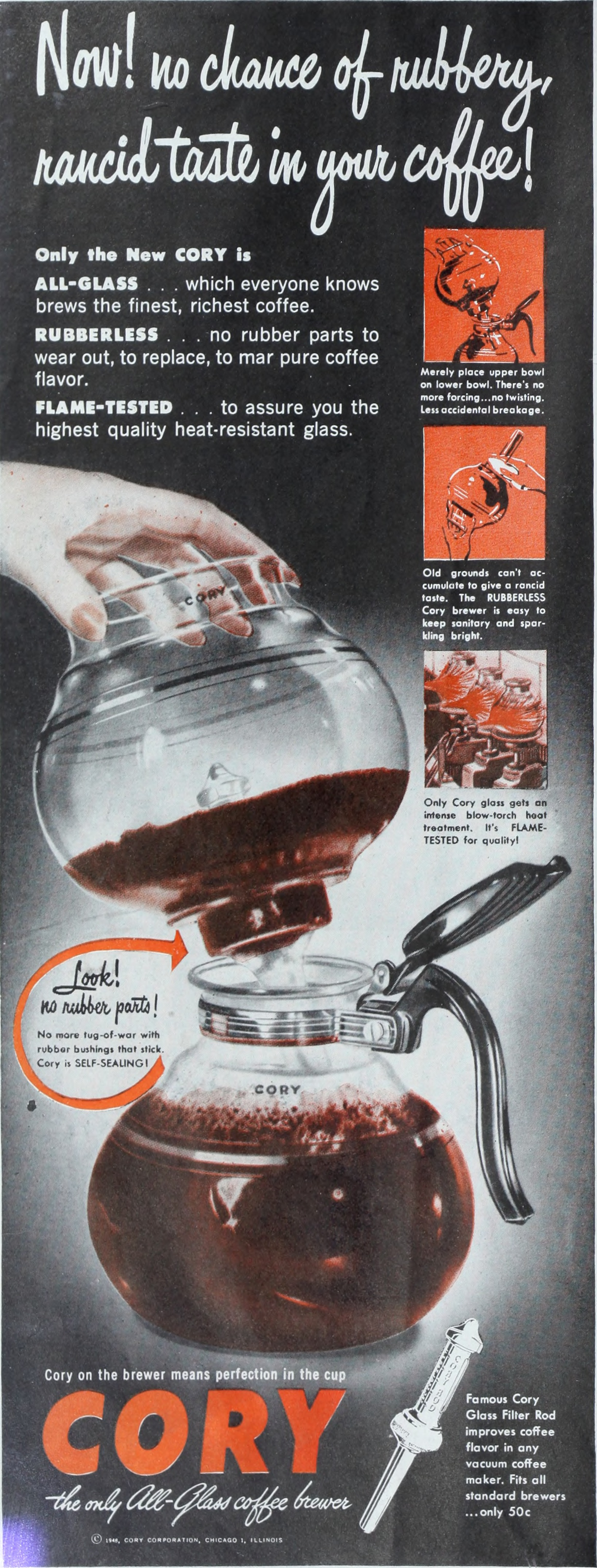
Cory coffee maker (1948 ad)

Harvey Cory patented his glass filter rod design (No. 114097), for which the patent was granted in 1939.

In 1951, the Cory Corporation, a Chicago company, bought Autopoint from Union Carbide. Cory operated Autopoint as a division appointing the president.

In the 1967, the Hershey Chocolate Corporation bought the Cory Corporation.

Later Hershey Chocolate sold this division to ARA Services (Aramark) making them the leading office coffee provider in the United States. As of 2017 Aramark provides over a billion cups of coffee a year to its customers.
