= Sarcus =

- Commune
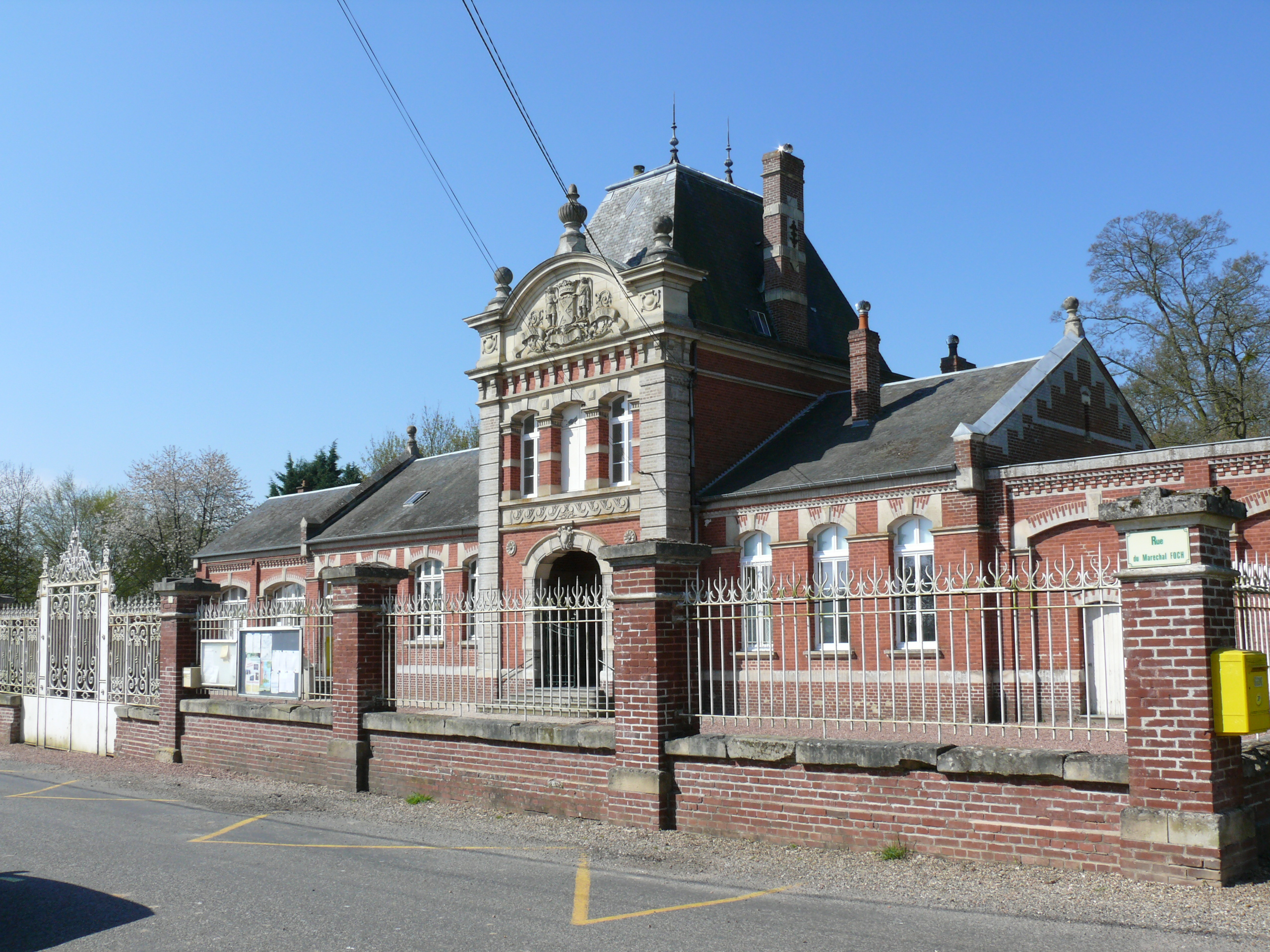
- The town hall in Sarcus

- Coat of arms
- Location of Sarcus
- Location within France Location within Hauts-de-France
- Coordinates: 49°41′11″N 1°52′18″E
- Country: France
- Region: Hauts-de-France
- Department: Oise
- Arrondissement: Beauvais
- Canton: Grandvilliers
- Intercommunality: Picardie Verte

Government
  - Mayor (2023–2026): Alain Drains
- Area^{1}: 13.04 km^{2} (5.03 sq mi)
- Elevation: 200 m (660 ft)
- Highest elevation: 214 m (702 ft)
- Lowest elevation: 163 m (535 ft)
- Population (2023): 262
  - Density: 20.1/km^{2} (52.0/sq mi)
- Time zone: UTC+01:00 (CET)
  - Summer (DST): UTC+02:00 (CEST)
- INSEE/Postal code: 60604 /60210
- ^{1} French Land Register data, which excludes lakes, ponds, glaciers > 1 km^{2} (0.386 sq mi or 247 acres) and river estuaries.

Sarcus (Picard: Sertchu) is a commune in the Oise department in northern France.

== See also ==
- Communes of the Oise department
