= Joseph K. Dixon =

American clergyman, lecturer and photographer

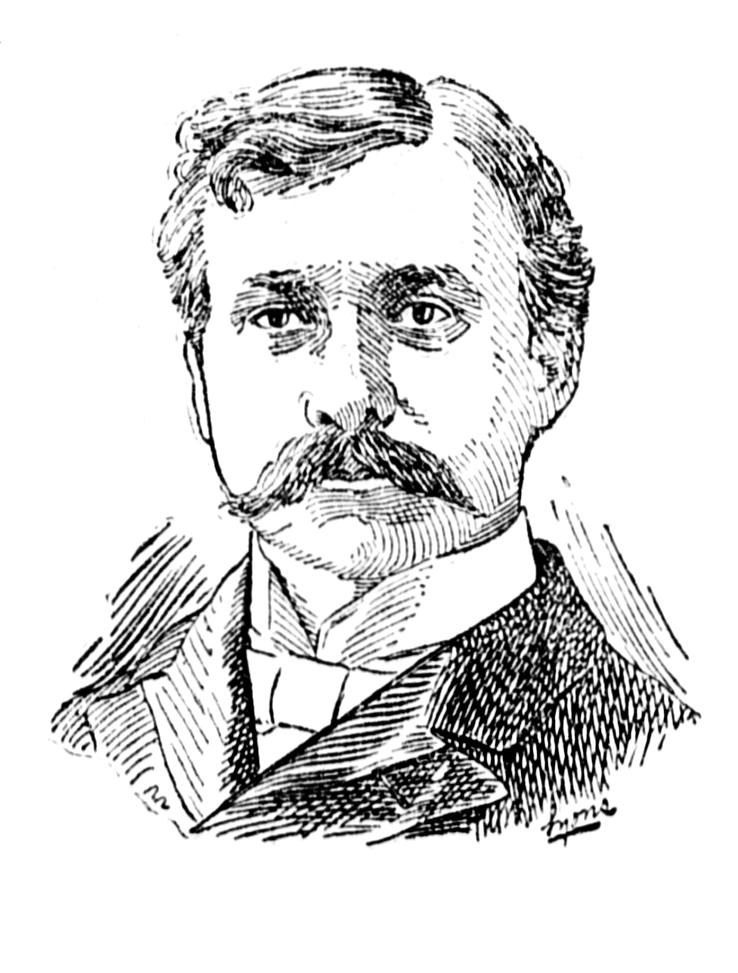
- Born: Joseph Kossuth Dixon; December 8, 1856; Hemlock Lake, New York,
- Died: August 24, 1926; Melrose Park, Pennsylvania
- Spouses: Anna (first wife); Angelia (second wife); Edith Reid (third wife)
- Parent(s): Adam Dixon and Ann Lightfoot Dixon

A 1913 photo of Bear Ghost, a chieftain of the Yanktonai Sioux, by Joseph K. Dixon

An Indian encampment in Montana, photo by Dixon.

Joseph Kossuth Dixon (1856–1926) was an American clergyman, lecturer, and photographer who led the Wanamaker expeditions visiting and photographing Native Americans (Indians) in the United States. After World War I, through his photographs, lectures, and interviews with Indians, Dixon publicized the contribution of Indian soldiers to victory in the war. He advocated for Indians to become U.S. citizens, a right granted to them in the Indian Citizenship Act ol 1924.

== Biography ==
Dixon was born in Hemlock Lake, New York, in 1856, to Irish immigrants Adam Dixon (later a captain for the Union army and ultimately a brigadier general, and Ann Lightfoot Dixon. He attended the Leavenworth Normal School in Kansas and graduated from Rochester Theological Seminary in 1883 with a Bachelor of Divinity. From 1883 to 1889 he was pastor of the First Baptist church in Auburn, New York. He moved to Epiphany Baptist Church in Philadelphia, leaving that post in 1895. That year Dixon was an interim pastor of Sioux Falls, South Dakota's First Baptist church. He ceased ministry later that year and worked for some religious publications before finding work giving lectures for Eastman Kodak from 1904 to 1906. Dixon received a degree from William Jewell College in 1897, and honorary Doctor of Divinity and Doctor of Law degrees from Bucknell University and Temple University, respectively.

After 1906 he was employed by Wanamaker's, giving educational lectures. Dixon fashioned himself as an expert on Native Americans, and convinced Rodman Wanamaker to fund the Wanamaker expeditions, three trips from 1908 to 1913 that visited Native American tribes, including a 1913 "Expedition of Citizenship". In 1909 Dixon attended a dinner where he talked to prominent Americans such as Buffalo Bill, Nelson A. Miles, and Leonard Wood and they discussed constructing a National American Indian Memorial. Dixon worked to create such a monument and ground was broken on Staten Island, New York by President William Howard Taft. However, plans for the monument were abandoned with the onset of World War I in 1914. Also, in 1914, Dixon authored a book titled The Vanishing American: The Last Great Indian Council. The book contained many of Dixon's photographs.

== Advocacy for Indian citizenship ==
Despite being born in the United States, most of the more than 300,000 American Indians in the U.S. were not citizens in the early 20th century. With the American entry into World War I Dixon advocated for Native Americans to enlist and after it ended in 1918 he advocated for Indians, especially those who had served in the military, to become citizens. He and other Indian citizenship advocates were partially successful in 1919 when former Indian soldiers were granted citizenship on request but few were aware of or took advantage of the opportunity.

In 1919, Dixon began documenting the experiences of Indians in the U.S. military during World War I. He began by visiting and interviewing Indians in the eastern U.S. and then expanded the project to include all American Indians. He sent questionnaires to former Indian soldiers and asked Indian agents, schools, and organizations to distribute the questionnaires to military veterans. The government's Office of Indian Affairs cooperated with him. He visited battlefields and military cemeteries in Europe and attended Indian ceremonies in the U.S. Dixon's objective was to write a book called From Tepees to Trenchesabout Indian experiences in the war to promote his advocacy for citizenship of all U.S.-born Indians. He never completed the book, although the adoption by Congress of the Indian Citizenship Act in 1924 accomplished his objective of citizenship. Dixon collected information from 2,846 Indian veterans of World War I, out of about 12,000 who served in the American armed services during the war.

Author Krouse said that Dixon wished to be remembered as "the champion of Indian citizenship but his real contribution lies in his documentation of the voices of American Indian veterans of World War I." His expeditions have been called a "charade" but he focused attention on the "vanishing race" (as he and others called the Indians) and impacted the adoption of the Indian Citizenship Act of 1924. A rival photographer of American Indians, Edward S. Curtis, accused Dixon of "imitating" Curtis's photos.

== Personal life ==
Dixon had three children, Rollin Lester, Florence Gail and Alice Lorraine Dixon with his first wife. His 1st wife divorced him in a contentious proceeding in Boston in 1900. He married again in 1901 per the 1910 Census for Montgomery County Pennsylvania to a woman, Angelia. When his second wife died in 1925, Dixon married third, Edith Reid, who was his secretary. Dixon died the following year on August 24, 1926, at his home at 1111 Stratford Ave in Melrose Park, Pennsylvania. Funeral services were held on the evening of August 26 and, again, on Saturday, August 28 at the First Baptist Church in Auburn, New York. He was buried at the Fort Hill Cemetery in Auburn.

== Bibliography ==
- Trachtenberg, Alan (1998). "Wanamaker Indians". The Yale Review. 86 (2): 1–24. doi:10.1111/0044-0124.00208.
- Barsh, Russel (January 1, 1993). "An American Heart of Darkness: The 1913 Expedition for American Indian Citizenship". Great Plains Quarterly.
- Lindstrom, Richard (1996). ""Not from the Land Side, but from the Flag Side": Native American Responses to the Wanamaker Expedition of 1913". Journal of Social History. 30 (1): 209–227. doi:10.1353/jsh/30.1.209. ISSN 0022-4529. JSTOR 3789755.
