= Lawrence V. Redman =

Canadian chemist (1880–1946)

Lawrence V. Redman (September 1, 1880 – November 26, 1946), was a Canadian chemist and businessman who spent much of his adult life in the United States. Redman was a pioneer in the industrial applications of plastics.

== Biography ==
Born in Oil Springs, Ontario, Redman took a B.A. degree from the University of Toronto in 1908. He continued his studies at the University of Kansas. In 1913, with the backing of S. Karpen & Bros., a Chicago furniture manufacturers, Redman established the Redmanol Chemical Products Company which produced a plastics similar to Bakelite. Redman was the president.

In 1922, the Redmanol company, the Condensite Company of America, and General Bakelite were consolidated into Bakelite Corporation. Redman became vice president and director of research. He retired in 1939.

Redman was a member of the American Chemical Society and its president in 1932.

== Bibliography ==
- "Redman, Lawrence V." The National Cyclopaedia of American Biography. 38:632-633.
