= Rodman Wanamaker =

American businessman (1863–1928)

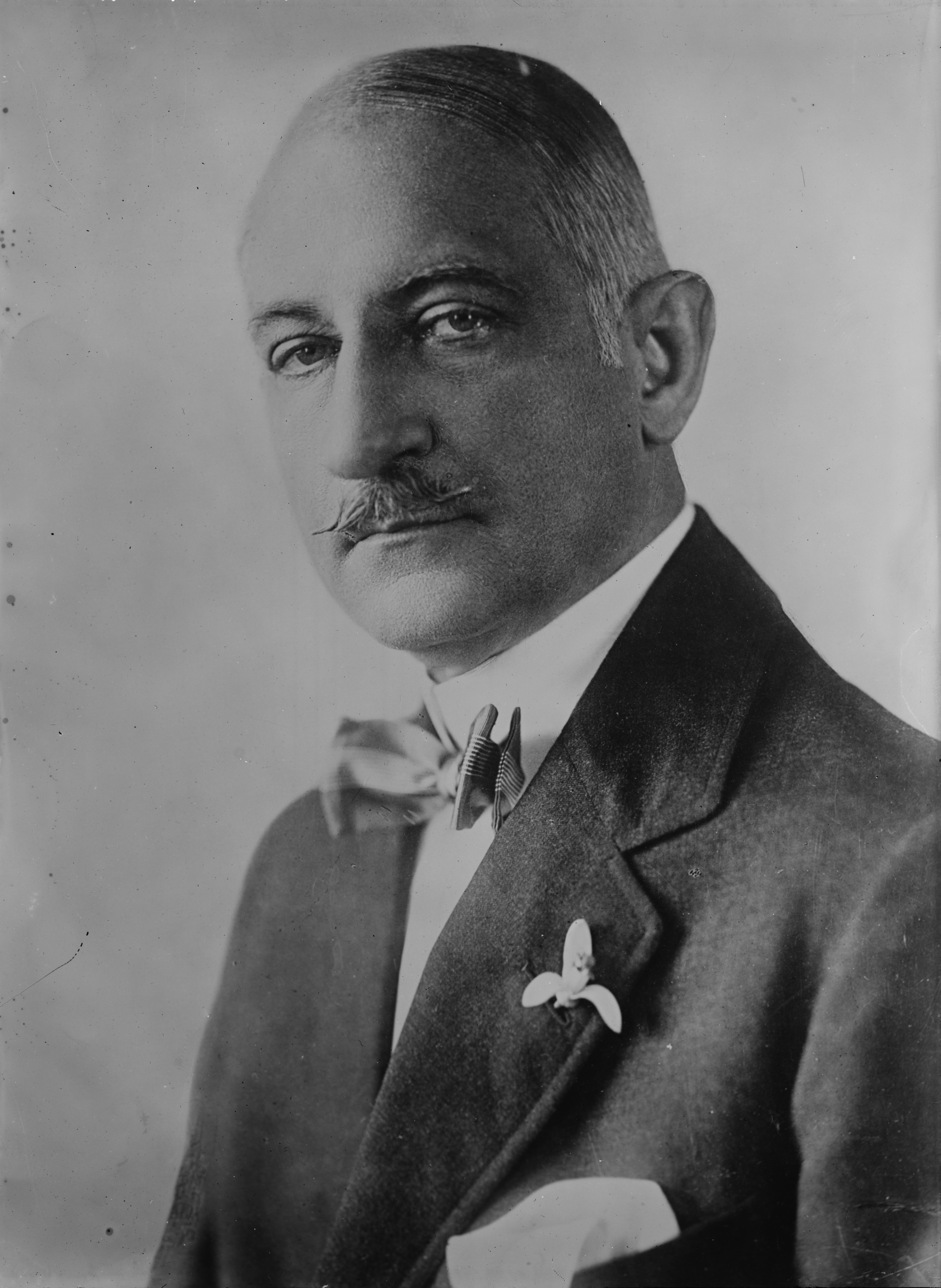
- Wanamaker in 1927
- Born: Lewis Rodman Wanamaker; February 13, 1863; Philadelphia, Pennsylvania, U.S.
- Died: March 9, 1928 (aged 65); Atlantic City, New Jersey, U.S.
- Education: Princeton University (AB)
- Spouse(s): Fernanda Antonia Henry (1863–1900) m. 1886; Violet Douglas Marie Cruger (1883–1944) m. 1909 div. 1923
- Children: Fernanda (1887–1958); John Nelson (1890–1934); Marie Louise (1895–1955)
- Parent(s): John Wanamaker; Mary Erringer Brown
- Relatives: Mary Brown Wanamaker (sister); Barclay Harding Warburton I (brother-in-law)

Lewis Rodman Wanamaker (February 13, 1863 – March 9, 1928) was an American businessman and heir to the Wanamaker's department store fortune. In addition to operating stores in Philadelphia, New York City, and Paris, he was a patron of the arts, education, golf, athletics, a scholar of Native American life, and a student of early aviation.

In 1916, he served as a presidential elector for Pennsylvania, and was appointed Special Deputy Police Commissioner of New York City under Richard Enright in February 1918. In this capacity, he founded the world's first police aviation unit and oversaw reorganization of the New York City Reserve Police Force. In 1916, Wanamaker originated the proposal for the Professional Golfers' Association of America.

== Early life and education ==
Wanamaker was born on February 13, 1863, in Philadelphia, to John Wanamaker and Mary Erringer Brown. He entered Princeton University in 1881, graduating in 1886. In college, he sang in the choir, and was a member and business manager of the Princeton Glee Club. He was a member of the Ivy Club, Princeton University's first eating club. He was a member of the 1885 Princeton Tigers football team that won the national championship with a dramatic last-minute punt return over the Yale Bulldogs.

== Career ==
In 1886, Wanamaker joined his father's business (Wanamaker's). He married Fernanda Henry of Philadelphia and went to Paris as resident manager in 1889, where he lived for more than ten years. When his father purchased the former Alexander Turney Stewart business in New York City, in 1896, he helped revolutionize the department store with top quality items and is credited in particular with fueling an American demand for French luxury goods.

In 1911, he bought the Philadelphia Evening Telegraph with his third cousin Samuel Martin Broadbent, who was also a Princeton University alumnus.

Wanamaker was content to live in his father's shadow and did not actively seek the limelight except for some official, largely ceremonial positions he held in New York City toward the end of his life. In 1922, before his death, his father turned over his holdings of the two Wanamaker's stores to Rodman. It represented one of the largest transfers of a retail merchandising business to a single person.

Rodman Wanamaker suffered from kidney disease in the last decade of his life, and the toxins from this condition slowly took their toll on his health. He had a son, Captain John Wanamaker, and two daughters, Fernanda and Marie Louise. The son had health problems that made his choice as successor to the family business increasingly problematic. After his death, control of the stores passed to a board of trustees charged with serving the interests of the surviving Rodman Wanamaker family.

Wanamaker died on March 9, 1928, in Atlantic City, New Jersey. He was interred in the Wanamaker family tomb in Church of St. James the Less in Philadelphia.

== Music ==
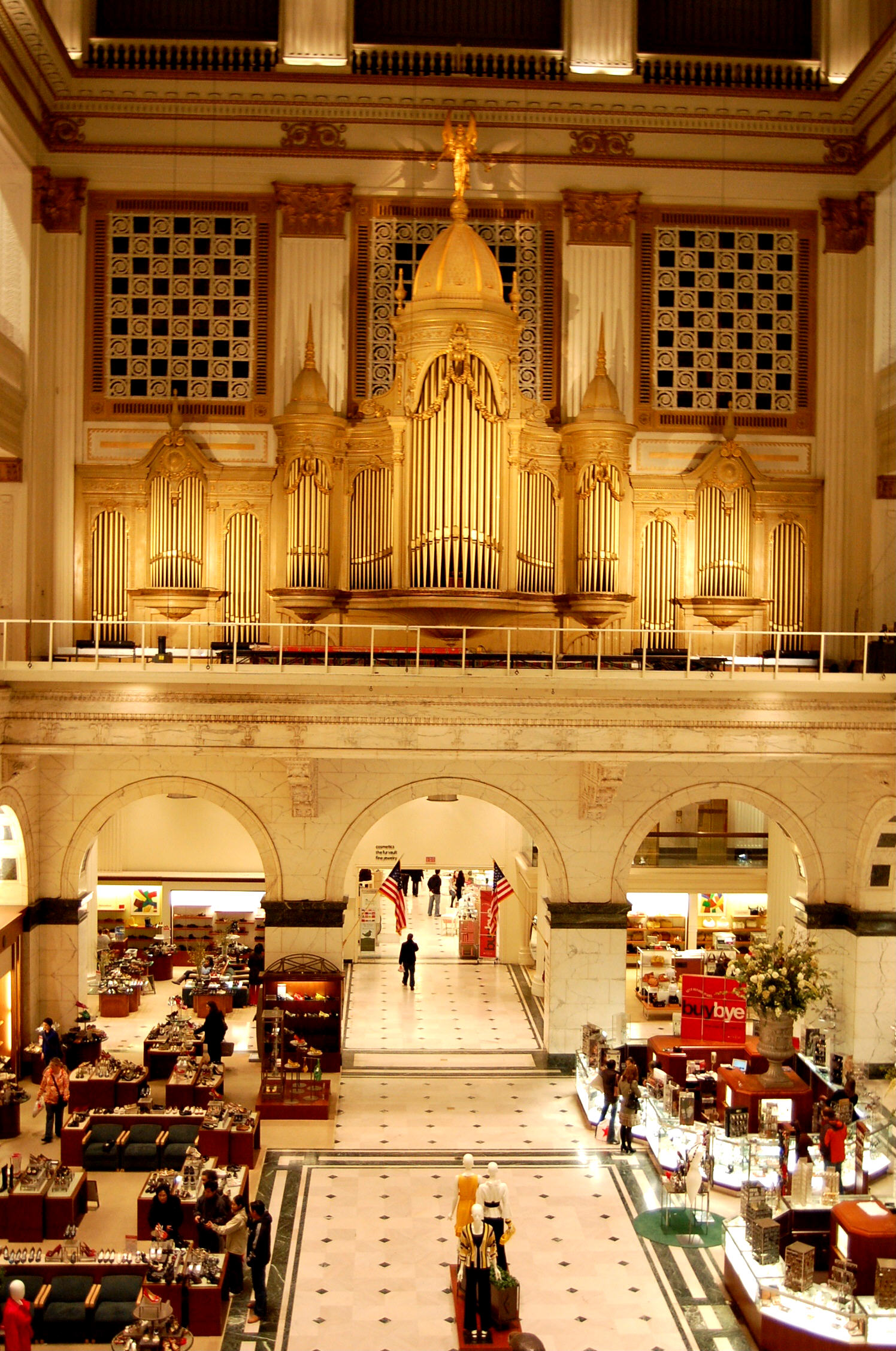
The Wanamaker Organ

The Wanamaker Organ in Wanamaker's (now Macy's) department store at 13th and Market Streets in Philadelphia, was substantially enlarged by Rodman Wanamaker in 1924. It is presently the world's largest fully functioning pipe organ (An organ with more pipes but fewer ranks is undergoing restoration at Boardwalk Hall, in Atlantic City, New Jersey). Wanamaker sponsored elaborate recitals in the Grand Court of the Philadelphia store, often featuring Leopold Stokowski and the Philadelphia Orchestra. As many as 15,000 people attended these admission-free events, at which all display counters and fixtures were removed by an army of workers so that seating could be put in place. Under Wanamaker's guidance famous organists were brought to play the Wanamaker Organs in Philadelphia and New York, including Marcel Dupré, Louis Vierne, Marco Enrico Bossi and Nadia Boulanger. Wanamaker also sponsored a Concert Bureau to book European organists on trans-American concert tours.

In 1926 Wanamaker commissioned a 17-ton bell from founders Gillett & Johnston. It was eventually placed atop the Wanamaker Men's Store at Broad Street and Penn Square in the Lincoln-Liberty Building (one block from then-Wanamaker's main store). Named the "Founder's Bell" in honor of Rodman's father John, founder of the store, it was the largest tuned bell in the world when it was cast.

Toward the end of his life, Wanamaker gathered a huge collection of stringed instruments, known as The Cappella, that featured violins and violas from such masters as Guarnerius and Stradivarius. They were heard at the Wanamaker Philadelphia store and at the White House on December 15, 1927. The orchestra concerts ended with Wanamaker's death in 1928, and the stringed instruments were also sold at that time.

Florence Price rose to prominence after winning First Prize in the Rodman Wanamaker Symphony Competition of 1932.

== Aviation ==
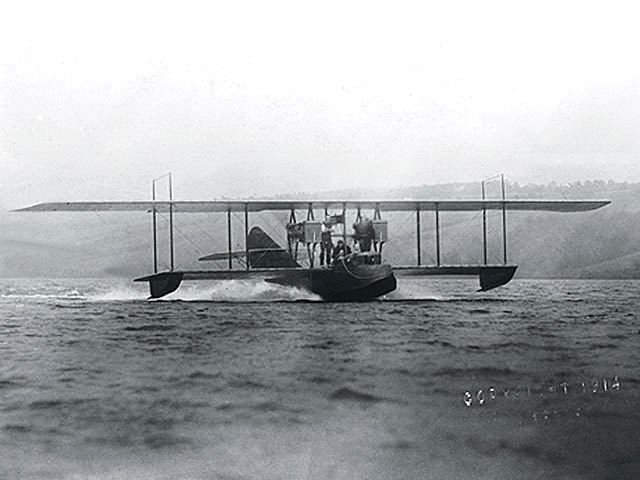
The America flying boat on Lake Keuka

Rodman Wanamaker was a pioneer in sponsoring record-breaking aviation projects and in particular and especially an important early backer of transatlantic flight development.

In 1913 he commissioned Glen Curtiss and his aircraft company to further develop his experimental flying boat designs into a scaled-up version capable of trans-Atlantic crossing in response to the 1913 challenge prize offered by the London newspaper The Daily Mail. The resulting America flying boat designed under John Cyril Porte's supervision did not cross the Atlantic because of the outbreak of World War I, but was sufficiently promising that the Royal Navy purchased the two prototypes and ordered an additional fifty aircraft of the model—which became the Curtiss Model H—for anti-submarine patrolling and air-sea rescue tasks. Shortly before the American entry into World War I in 1917, Wanamaker donated a Model H to the US government for use in the defense of New York. The design, with some improvements from both British and Americans, rapidly matured during the war and spurred the explosive post-war growth of the flying boat era of International Commercial Aviation. In this sense, Wanamaker holds at least some status as a founding father of an entirely new industry.

Through the American Trans-Oceanic Company he also funded efforts to increase aircraft range throughout the next decade, with a Wanamaker entry in the transatlantic challenge, the Fokker trimotor America flown by Commander Richard E. Byrd, taking to the air only a few days after Lindbergh's historic solo crossing on May 21–22, 1927 that won the cash prize in the contest. In both cases, aviation and arguably the world benefited from the sponsorship of Wanamaker.

== Liturgical arts ==
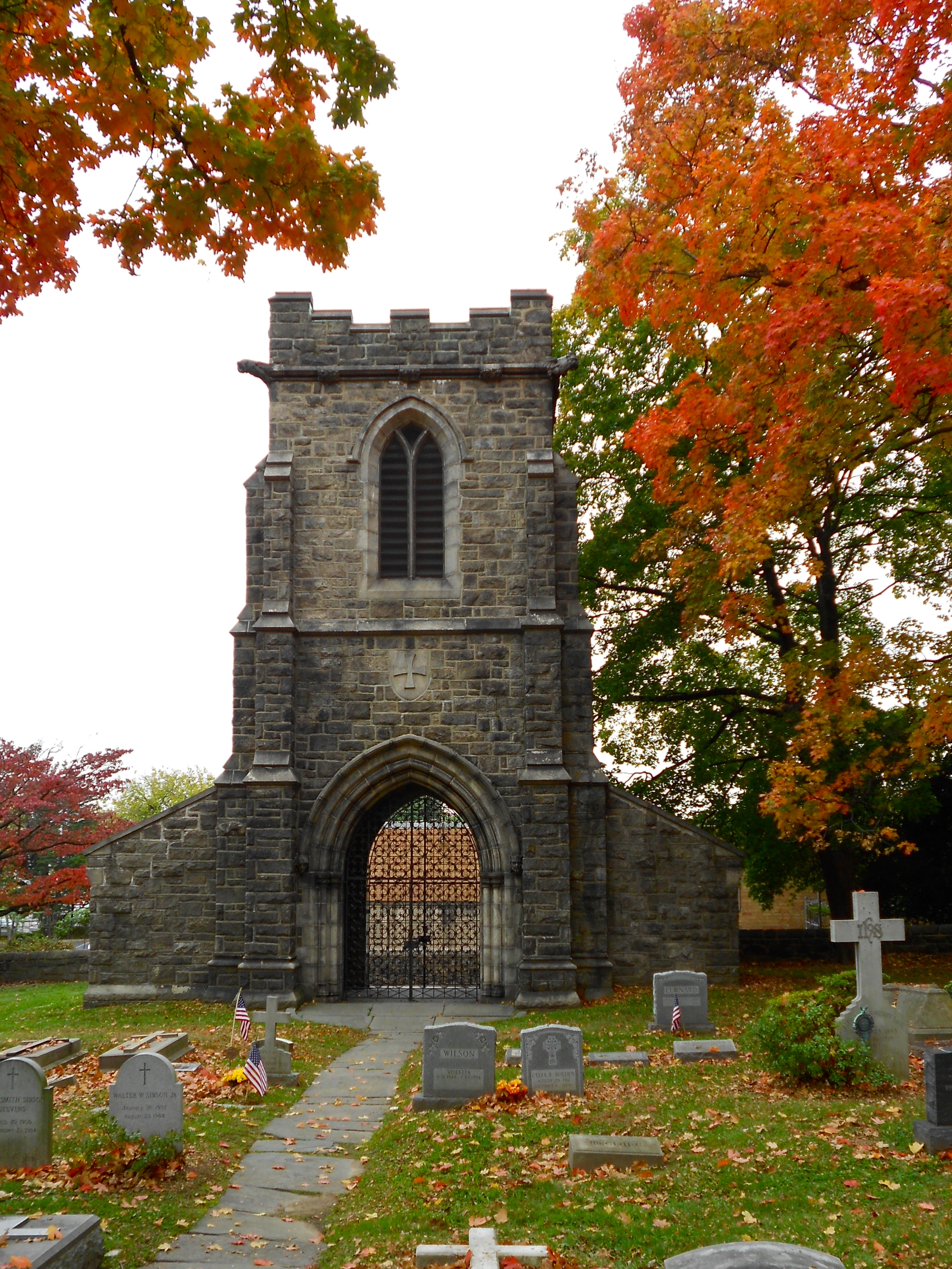
The Wanamaker Tomb and Bell Tower at the Church of St. James the Less, Philadelphia

Rodman Wanamaker was a patron of many important commissions in the field of liturgical arts, and his legacy includes a sterling silver altar and silver pulpit at St. Mary Magdalene Church, Sandringham, the church of the King's Sandringham House estate in Norfolk, England. He also presented a massive processional cross for Westminster Abbey, known as the 'Wanamaker Cross of Westminster', via his chief of staff Colonel William E Wood at a special service on Christmas Eve 1922. He made important additions to his Philadelphia parish of St. Mark's Church, notably the sumptuously appointed Lady Chapel, which was a memorial to his first wife, Fernanda.

He commissioned architect John T. Windrim to design a free-standing bell tower for the Church of St. James the Less in the Philadelphia neighborhood of Allegheny West. It is also an extensive mausoleum for the Wanamaker family.

== Wanamaker-Millrose Games ==
In 1908 Rodman Wanamaker initiated the Millrose Games. They are now held at The Armory in New York City. (Millrose was Wanamaker's country estate near Jenkintown, Pennsylvania.) He also inaugurated the Wanamaker Mile, and reportedly began the tradition of playing The Star-Spangled Banner at sporting events. The games were moved from Madison Square Garden to the Fort Washington Avenue Armory in 2012.

== Native Americans ==
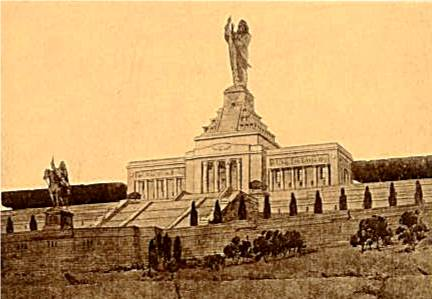
An Indian Memorial, 1913

Between 1908 and 1913, Wanamaker sponsored three photographic expeditions to the American Indians intended to document a vanishing way of life and make the Indian first-class citizens to save them from extinction. At that time, Indians were viewed as a vanishing race, and efforts were made to bring them increasingly into the mainstream of American life, often at the expense of their culture and traditions. Joseph Kossuth Dixon was the photographer. On the first expedition, he made many portraits and captured scenes of Indian life. Dixon published them in a book, The Vanishing Race. (Original copies of the book are becoming scarce as people break it up to sell the photographs individually.) The expedition climaxed on the Crow Indian Reservation with the filming of a motion picture about Hiawatha. The second expedition in 1909 involved a motion filming a reenactment of the Battle of the Little Big Horn. The third expedition, the "Expedition of Citizenship," took place in 1913. For it, the American flag was carried to many tribes, and their members were invited to sign a declaration of allegiance to the United States. In 2018, the film Dixon-Wanamaker Expedition To Crow Agency (1908) was selected to the National Film Registry as "culturally, historically, or aesthetically significant".

The resulting large bromide prints were presentation photographs, such collections having been placed in several museums. Mostly, the subjects are Blackfeet, Cheyennes, Crows, Dakotas, and other northern plains tribes. Both the glass prints and film negatives of the Wanamaker Collection photographed by Dr. J. Dixon were donated to Indiana University's Mathers Museum of World Cultures. They are currently stored at the museum. Many of his more popular pieces are displayed at the museum in both a traveling exhibit and as reprints from the original glass slides and negatives. For information on the exhibit or collections please contact the curator of collections. Thousands of original glass plate negatives are also held in the Research Library of the American Museum of Natural History in New York.

The Wanamaker photographic expeditions are fictionally treated in the novel Shadow Catcher by Charles Fergus.

In 1909, Wanamaker conceived the idea of a national monument to Native Americans. He developed the project for a Statue of Liberty-like colossal statue, and sponsored the 1913 groundbreaking for a National Memorial to the First Americans on Staten Island, at the mouth of New York Harbor. The monument was never built, but photographs of the groundbreaking are represented in the American Museum of Natural History's Library's collection.

== Professional Golfers Association ==
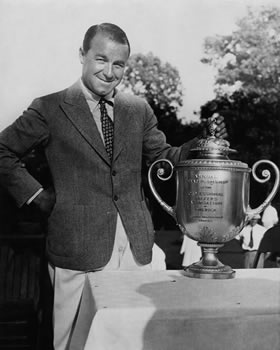
1933 PGA champion Gene Sarazen with the Wanamaker Trophy

On January 17, 1916, Wanamaker invited a group of 35 prominent golfers and other leading industry representatives, including the legendary Walter Hagen, and the "Father of American Golf" Alexander A. Findlay to a luncheon at the Taplow Club in New York for an exploratory meeting, which resulted in the formation of the Professional Golfers' Association of America (PGA). During the meeting, Wanamaker hinted that the newly formed organization needed an annual all-professional tournament, and offered to put up $2,500 and various trophies and medals as part of the prize fund. Wanamaker's offer was accepted, and seven months later, the first PGA Championship was played at Siwanoy Country Club in Bronxville, New York. Jim Barnes was the first winner of the event and Thomas Kerrigan, the Head Golf Professional at Siwanoy Country Club at the time, was the first player ever to tee off.

First held in October 1916, the PGA Championship has evolved into one of the world's premier sporting events, one of golf's four major championships. Each year, now in mid-May (mid-August prior to 2019), a top course in the United States hosts the world's best professionals, as they compete for the Wanamaker Trophy.

== World War I ==
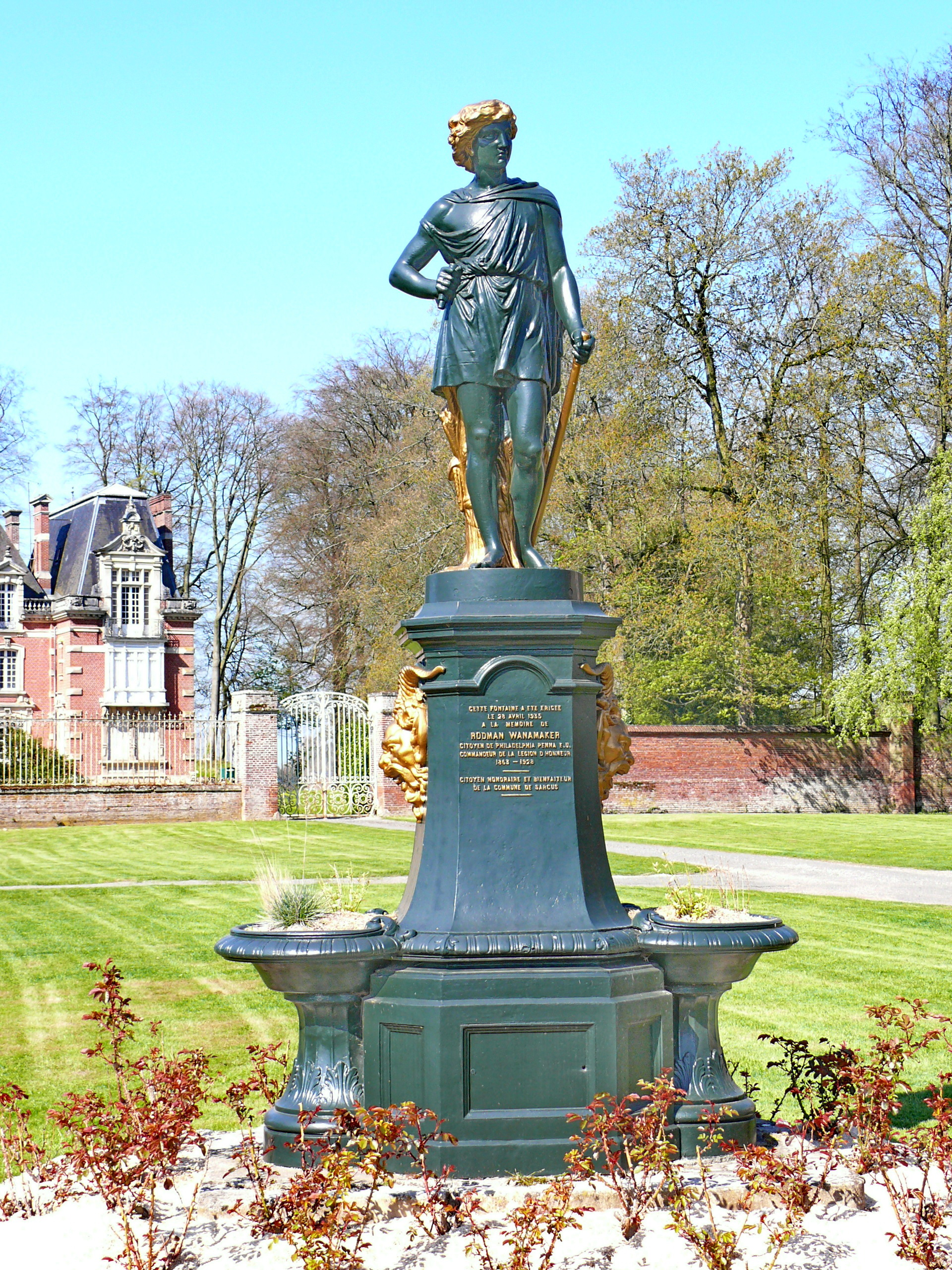
Wanamaker Fountain in Sarcus, France

He accepted an appointment during World War I as Special Deputy Police Commissioner in New York City, greeting distinguished guests from around the world and helping organize the victory parade for General John J. Pershing and the returning doughboys. He purchased more World War I bonds than anyone else in the United States, and generously allowed the use of his residences for the war effort, "virtually putting his enormous wealth at the disposal of the United States." After the war Wanamaker acted as something of an official greeter for the City of New York, often lending his Landaulette Rolls-Royce for ticker-tape parades.

After World War I, Wanamaker financed the rebuilding of a school in Sarcus, France. A town fountain was dedicated in his memory.

== Real estate ==
Wanamaker's winter home in Palm Beach, Florida, known as La Querida, or "the dear one", was built in 1923 by Addison Mizner. In 1933, the 11,300-square-foot (1,050 m^{2}) compound was purchased by Joe Kennedy for $120,000 (equivalent to $2,980,000 in 2025), and eventually gained notoriety as the "Winter White House" of President John F. Kennedy. Decades later, the compound was featured at the center of the 1991 William Kennedy Smith rape trial. In 1995 it was purchased by John K. Castle of Castle Harlan for $4.92 million (equivalent to $10,400,000 in 2025), and later sold in 2020 to undisclosed trustees for a reported $70 million (equivalent to $87,100,000 in 2025).

Wanamaker also owned a townhouse on Spruce Street in Philadelphia, a New York residence on Washington Square, a house in Atlantic City (where he died), and a country home near his father's estate in Jenkintown, Pennsylvania.

== See also ==
- Albert Leo Stevens
- Curtiss Wanamaker Triplane
