= Redmanol Chemical Products Company =

- Industry: Plastics Manufacturing
- Founded: 1913; 113 years ago
- Defunct: 1922
- Fate: Merged with Condensite Company of America and General Bakelite
- Successor: Bakelite Corporation

Redmanol Chemical Products Company was an early plastics manufacturer formed in 1913. Lawrence V. Redman was its president. In 1922, the Redmanol Company, the Condensite Company of America, and General Bakelite were consolidated into the Bakelite Corporation.
