= Wanamaker's =

American department store chain

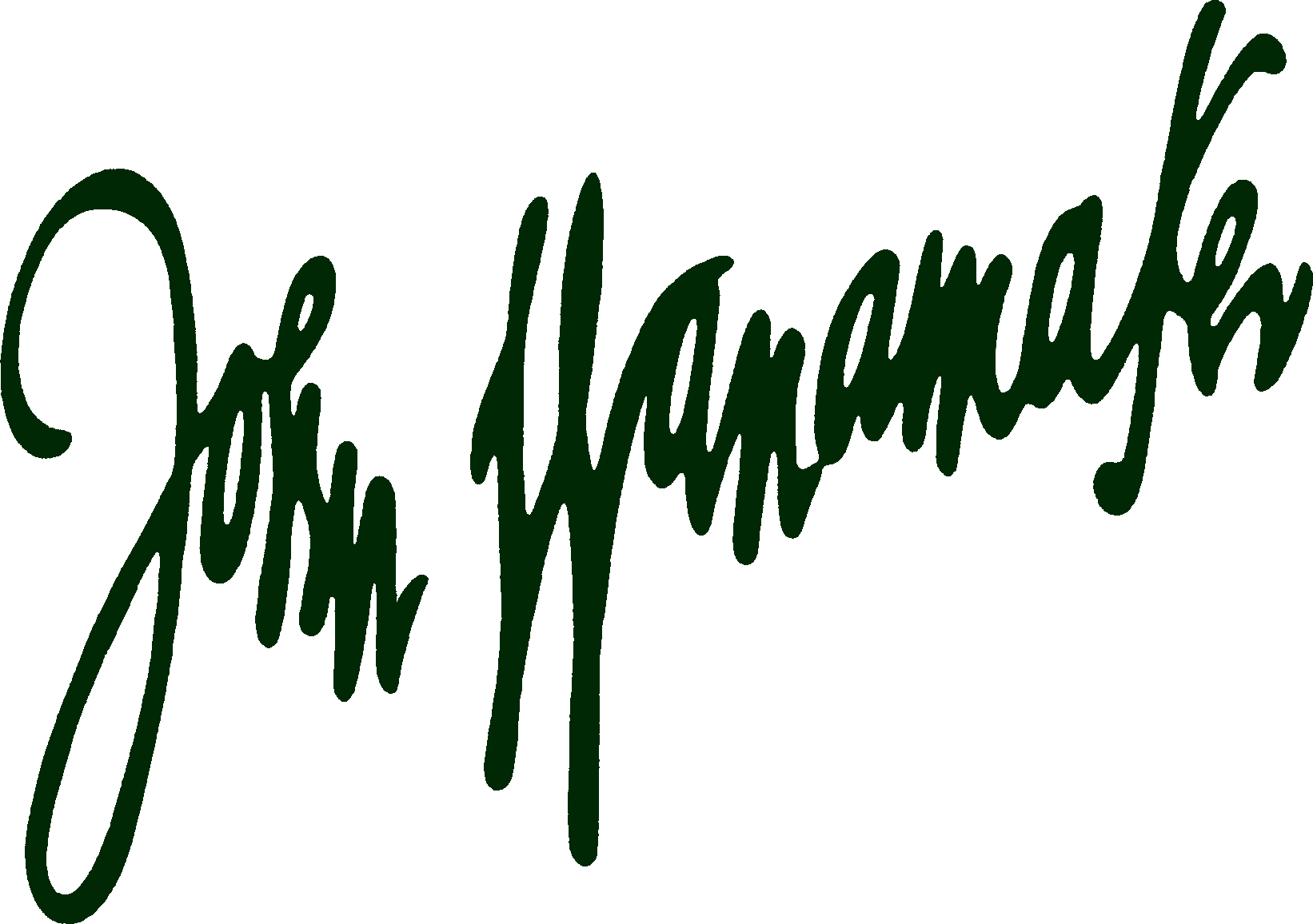

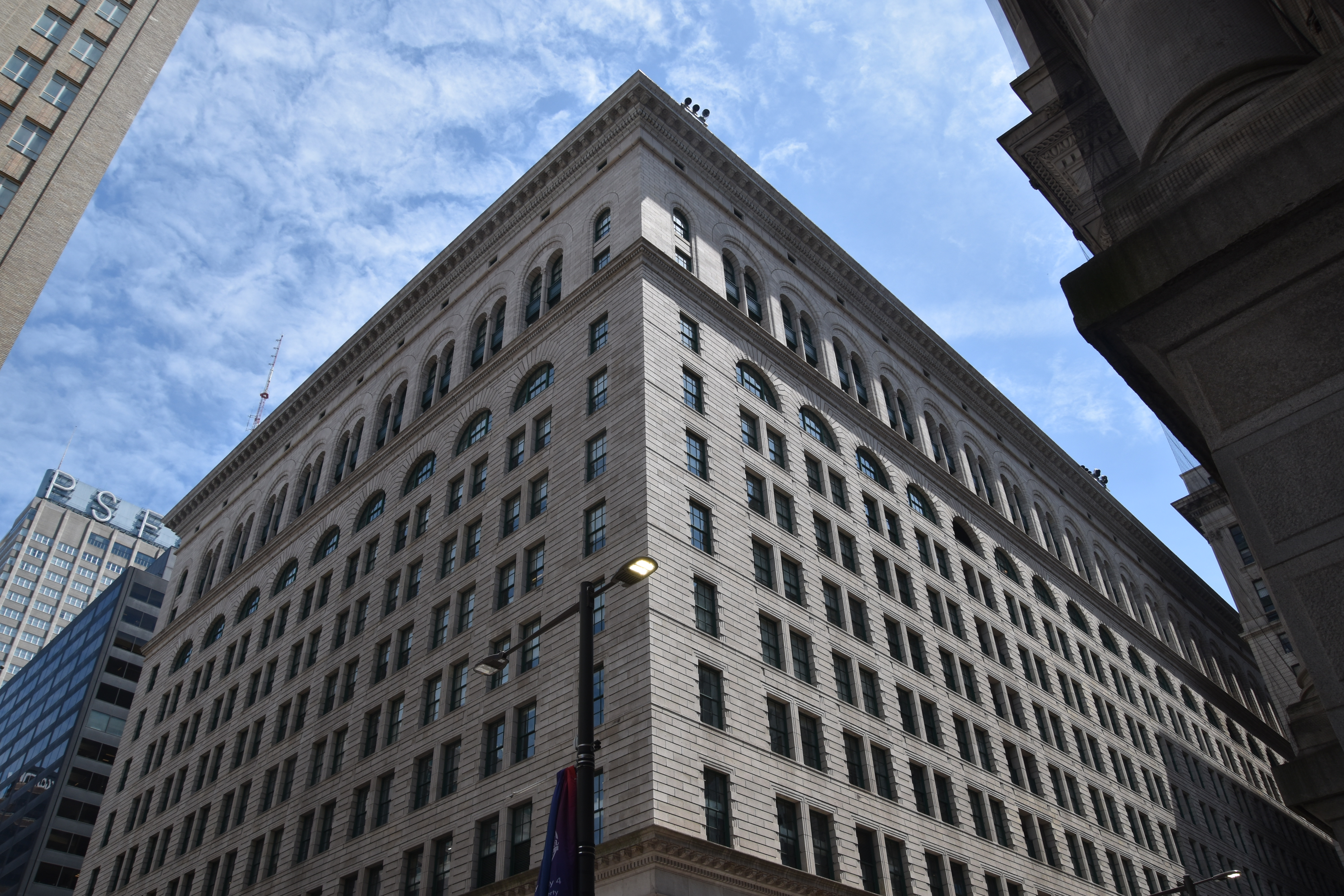
- Exterior of the former flagship John Wanamaker Store (2022)
- Type: Subsidiary
- Industry: Retail
- Genre: Department stores
- Founded: 1861; 165 years ago in Philadelphia, Pennsylvania, United States
- Founder: John Wanamaker
- Defunct: 1995; 31 years ago
- Fate: Acquisition by The May Department Stores Company
- Successor: Hecht's
- Headquarters: John Wanamaker Store, 1300 Market Street, Philadelphia, Pennsylvania, United States
- Number of locations: 16 (at peak)
- Area served: Northeastern United States
- Products: Clothing; footwear; housewares; furniture; toys; jewelry; linens
- Parent: Carter Hawley Hale Stores (1978-1986); Woodward & Lothrop (1986-1994); The May Department Stores Company (1994–1995)

Wanamaker's was an American department store chain founded in 1861 by John Wanamaker. It was one of the first department stores in the United States, and peaked at 16 locations throughout the Philadelphia metropolitan area in the 20th century. Wanamaker's was purchased by A. Alfred Taubman, who previously purchased the Washington, D.C. department store Woodward & Lothrop, in 1986. The store was acquired from bankruptcy by The May Department Stores Company in 1994, and converted all remaining Wanamaker's stores to Hecht's in 1995.

Wanamaker's was influential in the development of the retail industry including as the first store to use price tags.

== History ==
=== 19th century ===
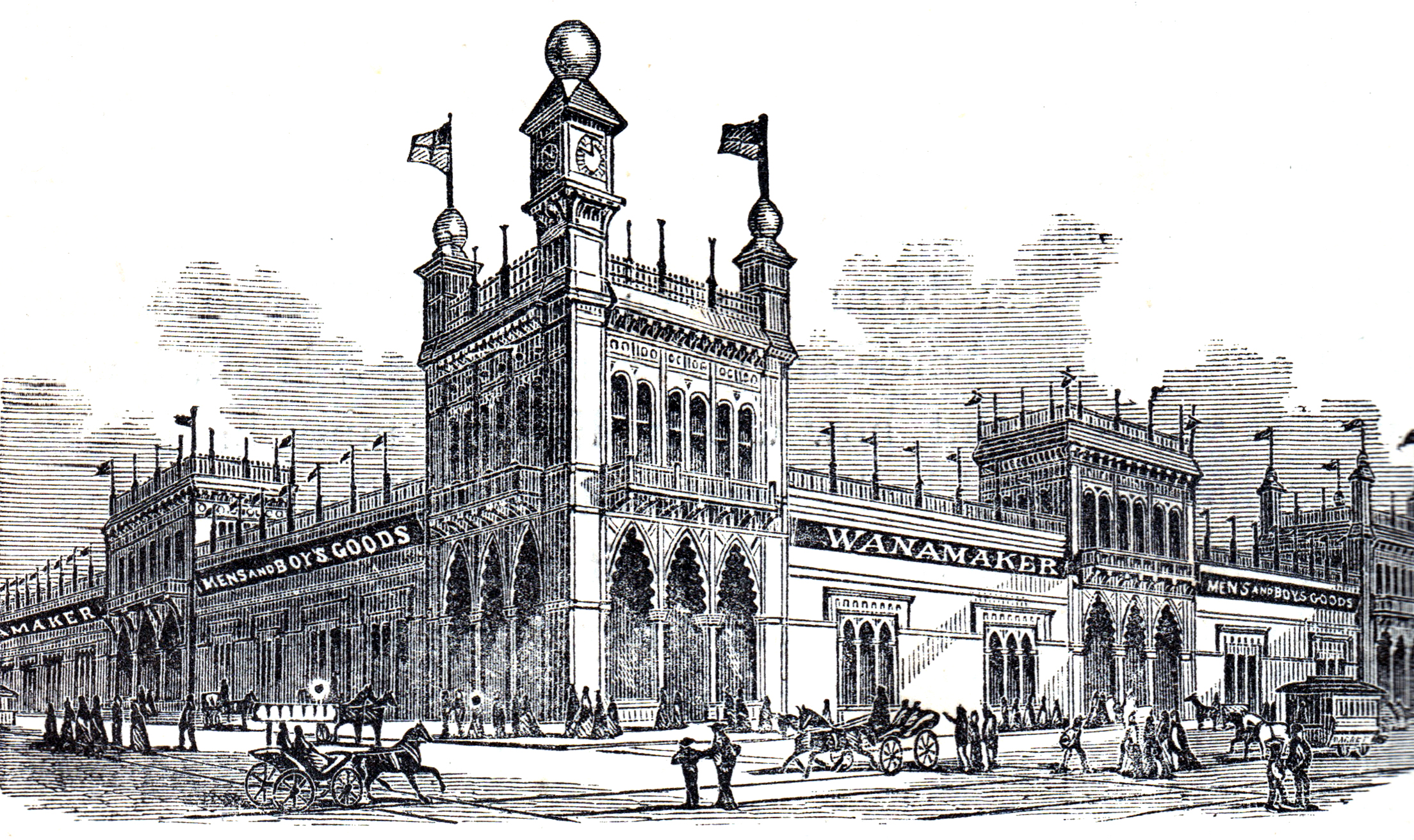
John Wanamaker's on Market Street in 1876

John Wanamaker was born in Philadelphia, Pennsylvania, in 1838. Due to a persistent cough, he was unable to join the U.S. Army to fight in the American Civil War, so instead started a career in business.

In 1861, he and his brother-in-law Nathan Brown founded a men's clothing store in Philadelphia called Oak Hall. Wanamaker carried on the business alone after Brown's death in 1868. Eight years later, Wanamaker purchased the abandoned Pennsylvania Railroad station for use as a new, larger retail location. The concept was to renovate the terminal into a "Grand Depot" similar to London's Royal Exchange or Paris's Les Halles and forerunners of the modern department store that were well known in Europe at that time.

The Wanamaker's Grand Depot opened in time to service the public visiting Philadelphia for the American Centennial Exposition of 1876, and in fact resembled one of the many pavilions at that world's fair because of its fanciful new Moorish Revival façade. In 1877, the interior of Wanamaker's was refurbished and expanded to include not only men's clothing, but women's clothing and dry goods as well. This was Philadelphia's first modern-day department store, and one of the earliest founded in America. A circular counter was placed at the center of the building, and concentric circles radiated around it with 129 counters of goods. The store also accepted mail orders, though it was not a large business until the early twentieth century.

Wanamaker first thought of how he would run a store on new principles when, as a youth, a merchant refused his request to exchange a purchase. A practicing Christian, he chose not to advertise on Sundays. Before he opened his Grand Depot for retail business, he let evangelist Dwight L. Moody use its facilities as a meeting place, while Wanamaker provided 300 ushers from his store personnel. His retail advertisements—the first to be copyrighted beginning in 1874—were factual, and promises made in them were kept.

Wanamaker guaranteed the quality of his merchandise in print, allowed his customers to return purchases for a cash refund and offered the first restaurant to be located inside a department store. Wanamaker also invented the price tag.

His employees were to be treated respectfully by management (including not being scolded in public), and John Wanamaker & Company offered its employees access to the John Wanamaker Commercial Institute, as well as free medical care, recreational facilities, profit sharing plans, and pensions—long before these types of benefits were considered standard in corporate employment.

Innovation and "firsts" marked Wanamaker's. The store was the first department store with electrical illumination (1878), first store with a telephone (1879), and the first store to install pneumatic tubes to transport cash and documents (1880).

Wanamaker's commissioned a Philadelphia/New Jersey artist, George Washington Nicholson (1832–1912), to paint a large landscape mural, "The Old Homestead", which was finished in March 1892. The 7-by-14-foot (2.1 by 4.3 m) mural was still owned by Wanamaker's in 1950, but has since passed into a private collection.

=== 20th century ===
The existing Grand Depot was razed and replaced with the flagship John Wanamaker Store in 1911. News of the Titanic's sinking was transmitted to Wanamaker's Wireless station in New York City, and given to anxious crowds waiting outside—yet another first for an American retail store. Public Christmas Caroling in the store's Grand Court began in 1918.

In 1919, El Mundo, a Spanish newspaper, reported that Wanamaker's New York store had 100 specialized departments all under one roof, including El Departamento de Latino-Americano de Servicio Personal (The Department of Personal Service for Latin-Americans).

Other innovations included employing buyers to travel overseas to Europe each year for the latest fashions, the first White sale (1878) and other themed sales such as the February "Opportunity Sales" to keep prices as low as possible while keeping volume high. The store also broadcast its organ concerts on the Wanamaker-owned radio station WOO beginning in 1922. Under the leadership of James Bayard Woodford, Wanamaker's opened piano stores in Philadelphia and New York that did a huge business with an innovative fixed-price system of sales. Salons in period decor were used to sell the higher-price items. Wanamaker also tried selling small organs built by the Austin Organ Company for a time.

After John Wanamaker's death in 1922, the business carried on under Wanamaker family ownership. Rodman Wanamaker, John's son, enhanced the reputation of the stores as artistic centers and temples of the beautiful, offering imported luxuries from around the world. After his death in 1928, the stores (managed for the family by a trust) continued to thrive for a time. The men's clothing and accessories department was expanded into its own separate store on the lower floors of the Lincoln-Liberty Building, two doors down on Chestnut Street, in 1932. This building, which also had a private apartment for the Wanamaker family on its top floor, was sold to Philadelphia National Bank in 1952; the initials on the building's crown read "PNB" until November 2014, even though the bank no longer existed.

In the late 20th century, Wanamaker's lost business to other retail chains, including Bloomingdale's and Macy's, in the Philadelphia market. The Wanamaker Family Trust finally sold John Wanamaker and Company, with its underpatronized stores, to Los Angeles-based Carter Hawley Hale Stores for US$60 million (~$232 million in 2025) cash in 1978. Carter Hawley Hale poured another $80 million into renovating the stores, but to no avail—customers had gone elsewhere in the intervening decades and did not come back.

In late 1986, the now 15-store chain was sold to Woodward & Lothrop, owned by Detroit shopping-mall magnate A. Alfred Taubman, for around $180 million (~$448 million in 2025). Taubman reorganized the business with a shortened corporate name (Wanamaker's Inc.), and poured millions more into store renovations and public relations campaigns. This too was no help, as Taubman's retail interests were heavily in debt and the stores' combined sales were a disappointment.

==== Acquisition by May and conversion to Hecht's ====
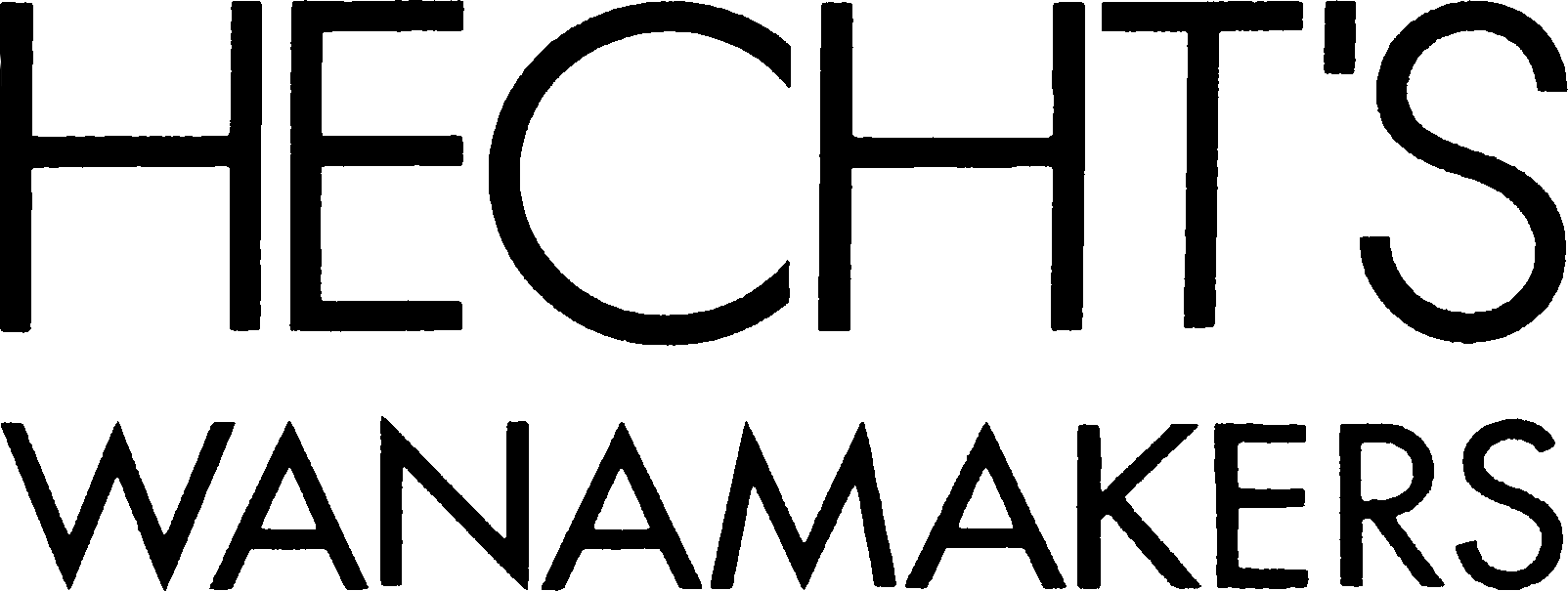
Hecht's-Wanamaker's transition logo

Woodward & Lothrop collapsed in bankruptcy, filing for Chapter 11 on January 17, 1994. The Wanamaker's chain was sold to May Department Stores Company on June 21, 1995. Wanamaker's Inc. was formally dissolved, and operations were consolidated with May's Hecht's division in Arlington, Virginia. After 133 consecutive years, the Wanamaker's name was removed from all stores and replaced with Hecht's on November 1, 1995.

==== Post-Wanamaker's history of the Center City anchor store ====
In April 1996, May acquired Wanamaker's historic rival Strawbridge & Clothier and re-branded all Philadelphia-area Hecht's locations as Strawbridge's in July 1996, including the Center City flagship. The building closed soon after for renovation and refurbishment, which saw the retail space reduced in size again to three floors, with two more upper floors converted to commercial office space. The flagship structure was sold again in early 1997, to Amerimar Realty. The retail portion reopened in August 1997 as a branch of New York-based Lord & Taylor, another division of May Department Stores. In August 2006 the store was converted to Macy's, operated by the Macy's East Division of Federated Department Stores Inc., now Macy's, Inc., which acquired May in late 2005. The store closed permanently on March 23, 2025.

The former New York Wanamaker's store on Broadway had retail space occupied by Kmart by 1996, and later Wegmans (2023).

The store was not immune to the major change in retailing away from regional chains to national chains. The uniformity of brand offerings and the cost savings available to national chains all worked against the viability of the store as an independent personality, although customers generally had a major say in determining store offerings and the magnificence of its commercial space did tend to cause it to be stocked with better offerings. Other retailers had also learned to offer goods with much smaller staff rosters. The ability of retailers to go national in opposition to regional tastes is still an experiment-in-progress with mixed results.

== Suburban branch stores ==
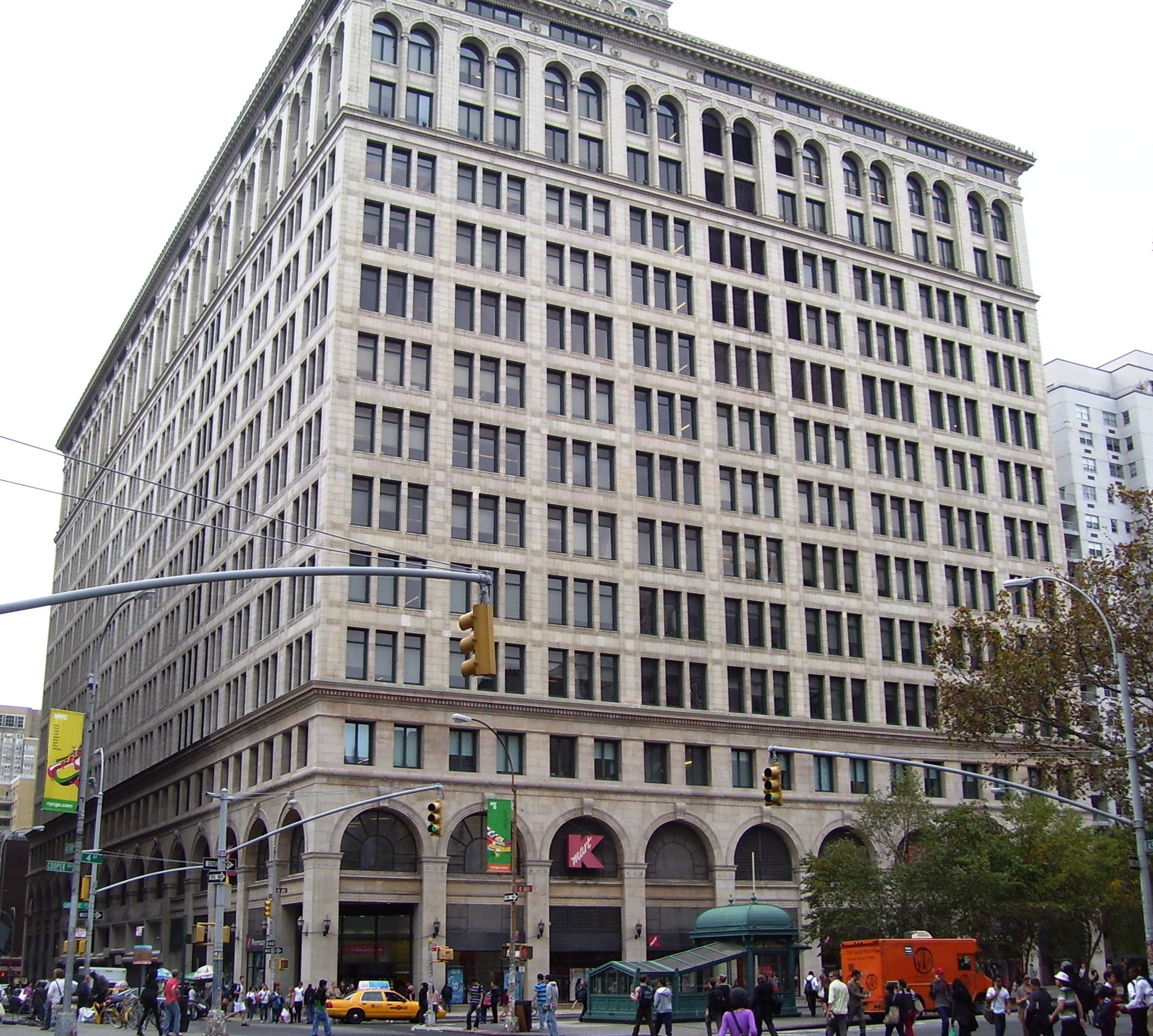
The second Wanamaker's at 770 Broadway, NYC

Wanamaker's opened a store in Wilmington, Delaware in 1950. After the New York store closed in 1954, Wanamaker's expanded to the Philadelphia suburbs, starting with the Wynnewood store in December 1954. The second suburban branch opened in 1958 in Jenkintown, not far from the Strawbridge and Clothier store. The store at Moorestown Mall opened in 1963. Other prominent suburban branch stores included King of Prussia Mall (1963), Harrisburg Mall (1969), Berkshire Mall (1970), Oxford Valley Mall (1973), Springfield Mall (1974), Deptford Mall (1975), Roosevelt Mall (1976), Lehigh Valley Mall (1976), Montgomery Mall (1977) and Christiana Mall (1991, last Wanamaker's store built).

== See also ==
- Joseph K. Dixon
- Millrose Games
- Wanamaker Mile
- Wanamaker Trophy for golf's PGA Champion
- List of department stores converted to Macy's

== Gallery ==
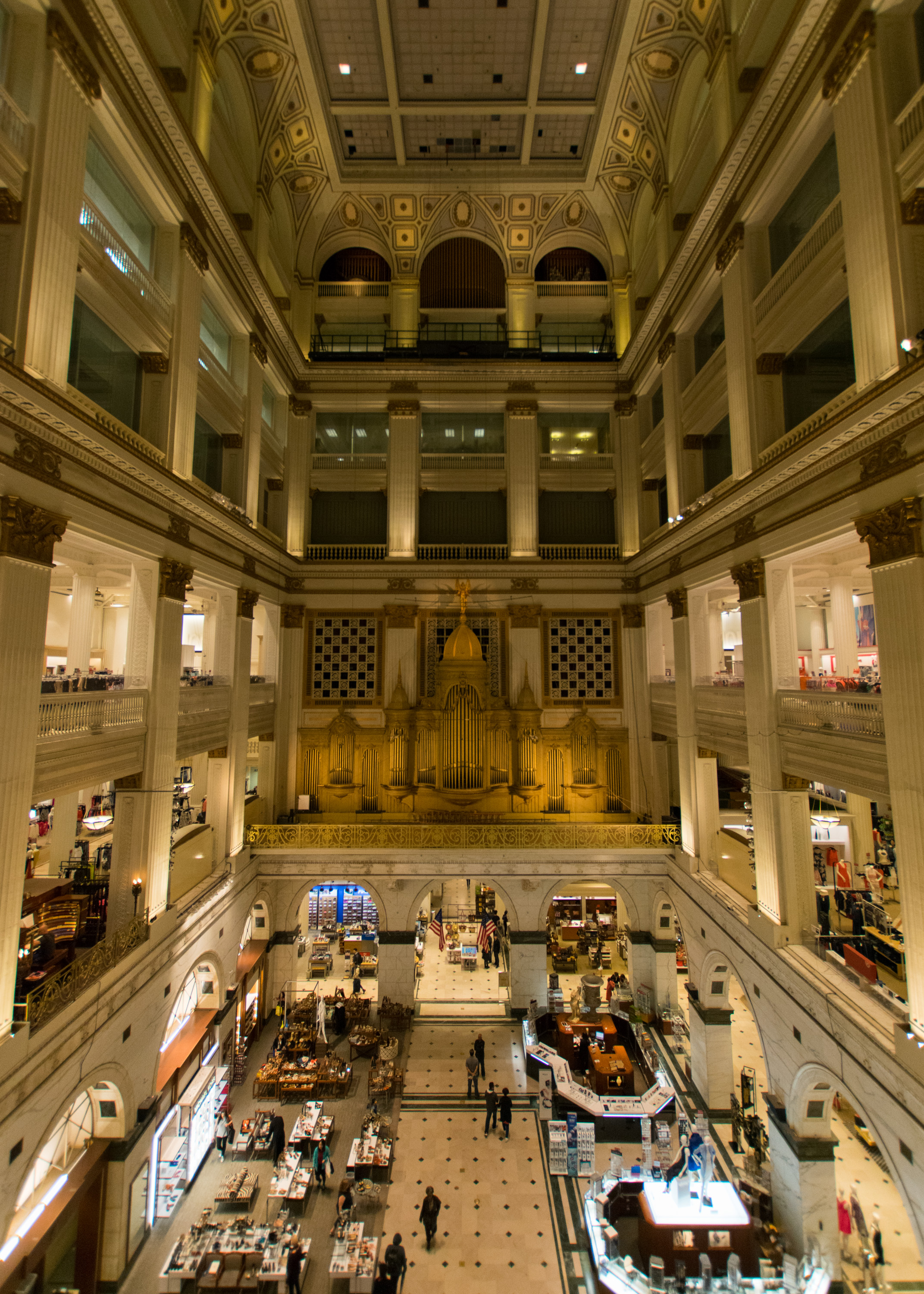
The grand court at the original Wanamaker's at 1300 Market Street in Philadelphia in May 2017

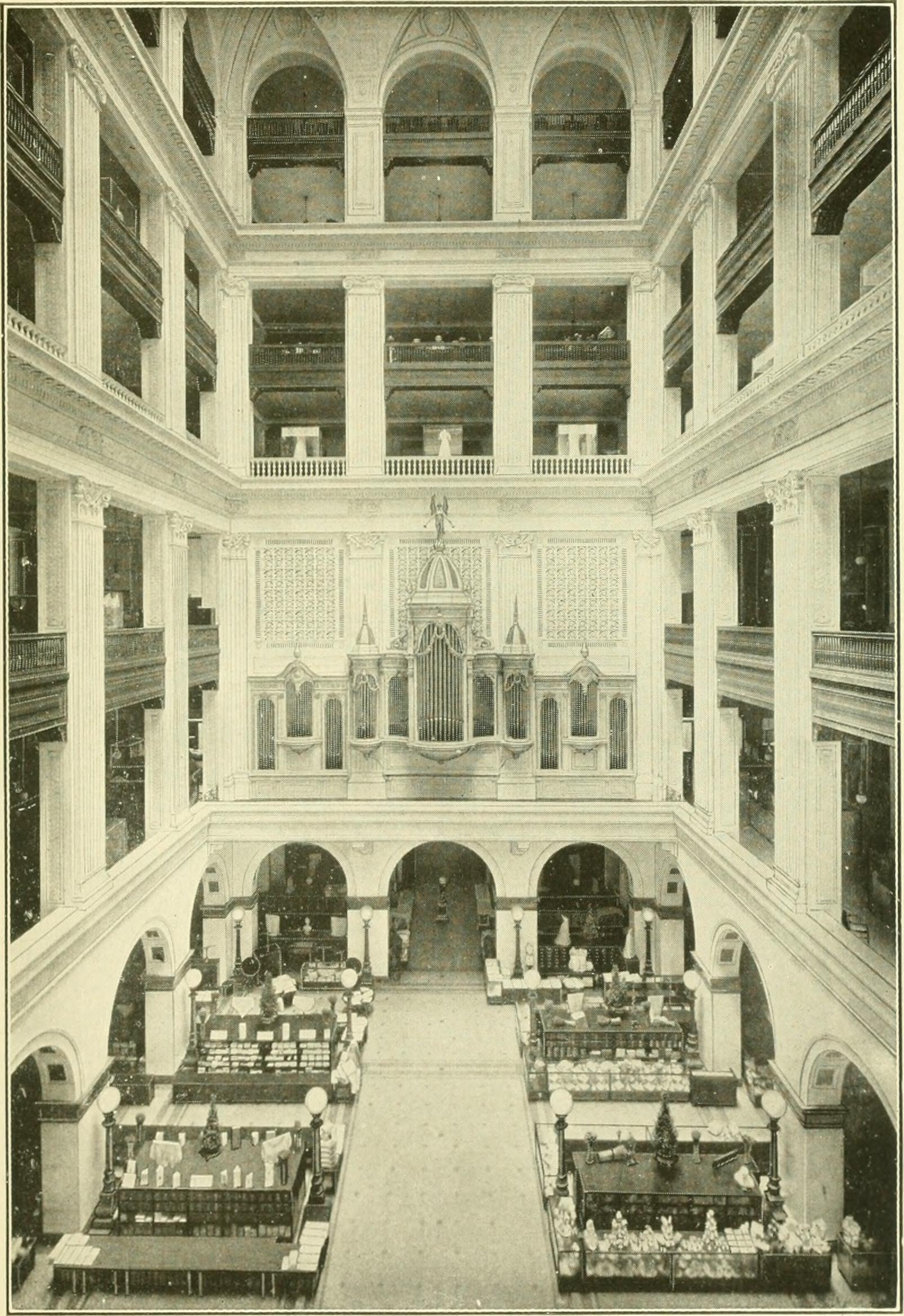
The Grand Court in the Wanamaker Store in Philadelphia, showing the organ façade at the south end in 1917

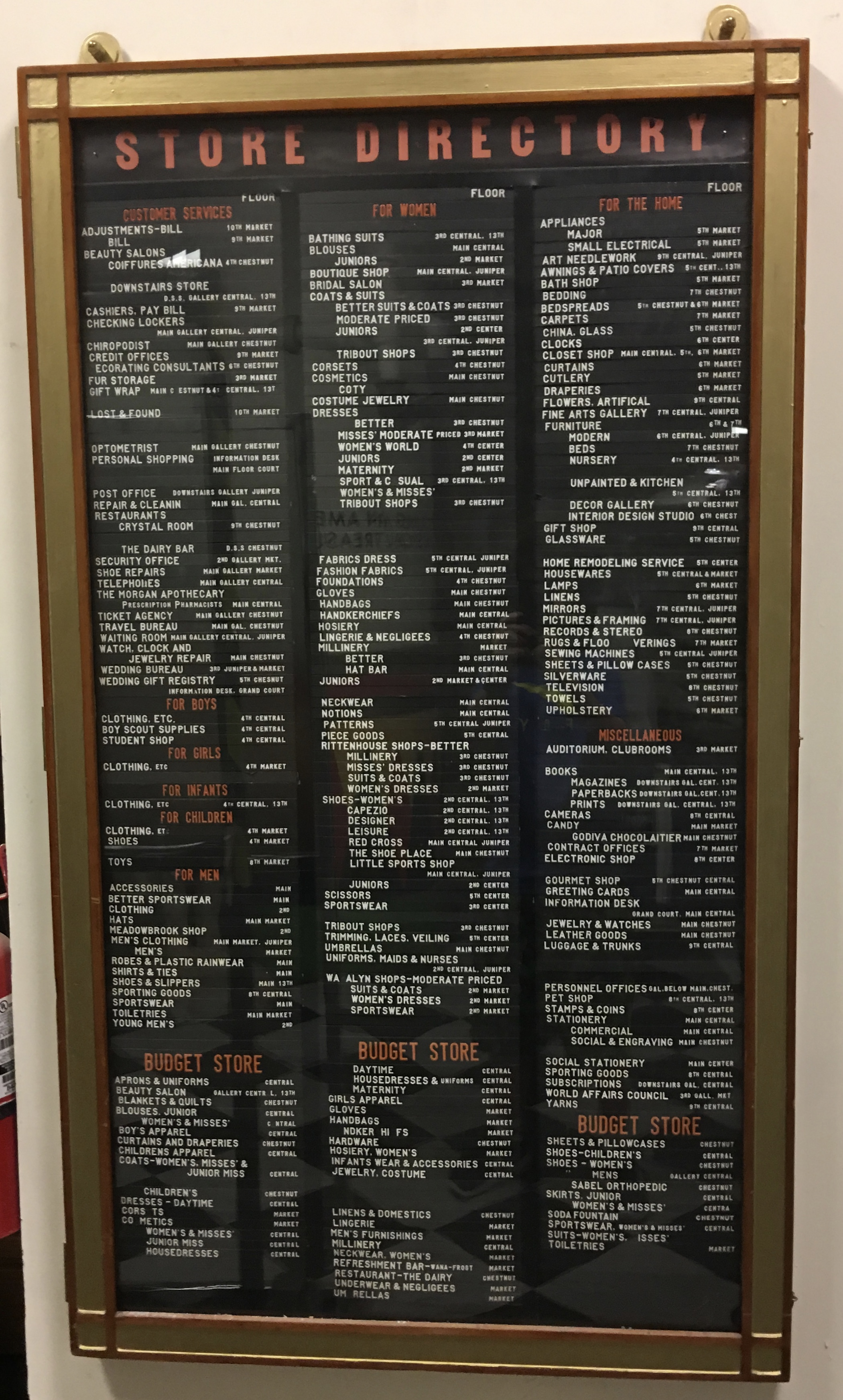
The flagship store directory

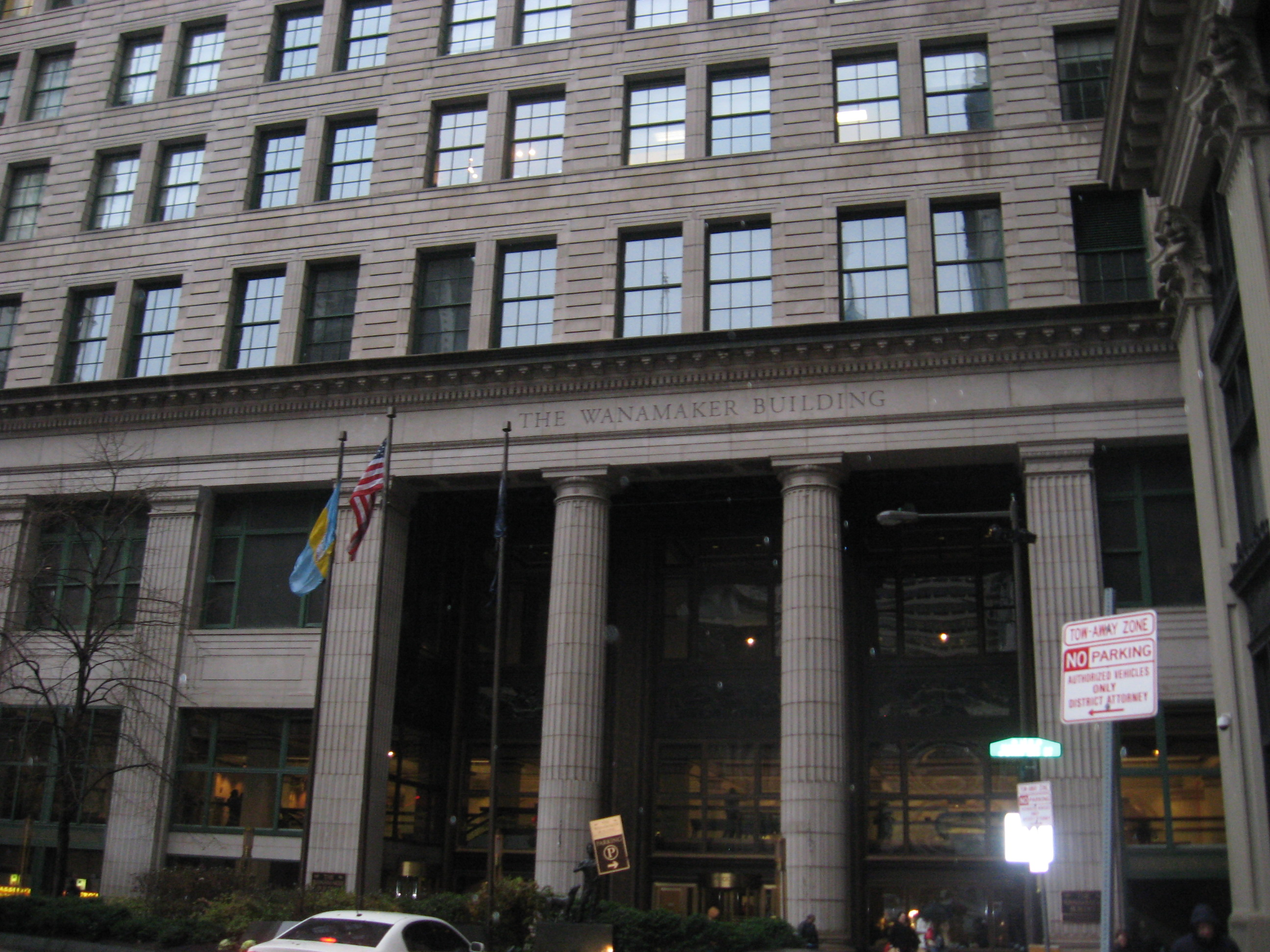
Wanamaker's from South Penn Square

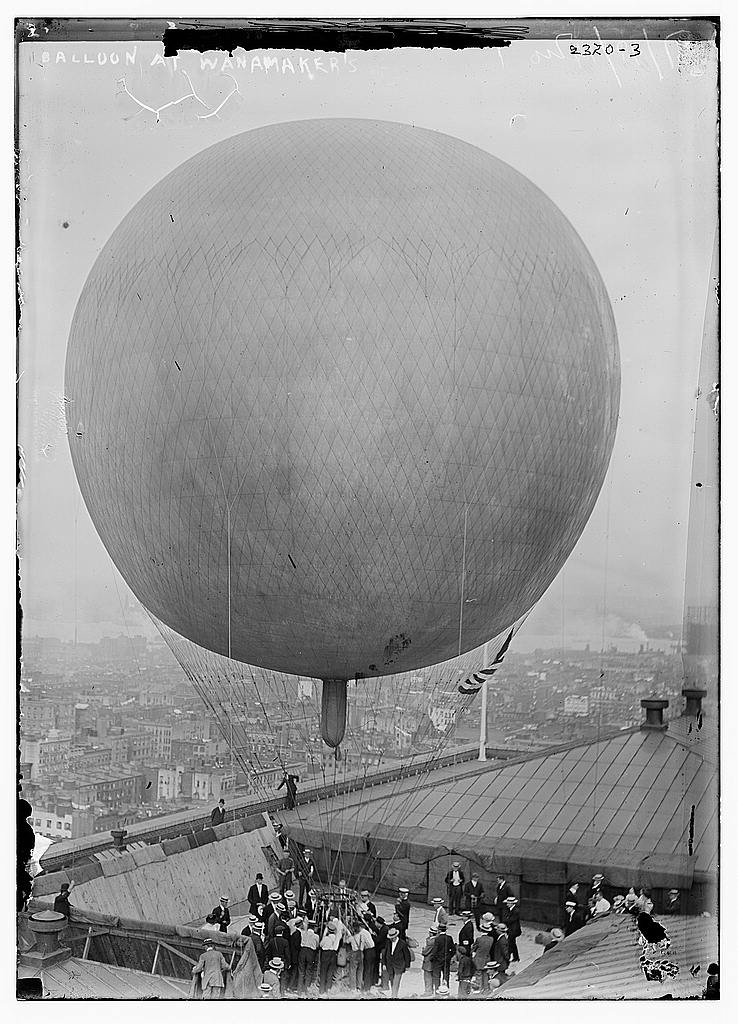
Albert Leo Stevens ascends from Wanamaker's in New York City in 1911
