= Alexander Russell (composer) =

American classical composer

- Born: George Alexander Russell Jr. October 2, 1880; Franklin, Tennessee, US
- Died: November 26, 1953 (aged 73); DeWitt, New York, US
- Known for: organ impresario, educator and organist

George Alexander Russell Jr. (1880–1953) was an American composer, organist and the first Frick Professor of Music for Princeton University. He is most remembered today as the long time organ impresario for the Wanamaker Department Stores.

== Early life ==
George Alexander Russell Jr. was born on October 2, 1880, in Franklin, Tennessee, son of a Presbyterian minister. He received his first musical instruction at age 10, from his mother who was an accomplished musician.

== Education ==
He was enrolled at Syracuse University at age 16 and graduated with highest honors in 1901. His teachers included George Albert Parker (1856-1939), organ; Adolf Frey, piano; and William Berwald, composition. Russell was subsequently appointed to the faculty at Syracuse and for the next four years he was professor of piano and organ as well as assuming the position of organist at several local churches. During this time he made the acquaintance of young organ virtuoso Charles M. Courboin, whose career he would eventually manage and with whom he was to stage many organ concerts at the Wanamaker stores beginning with the rededication concert of the Philadelphia organ in 1919.

In 1906 he went to Europe to study in Berlin and Paris. He first studied piano with Leopold Godowsky with whom he acquired expert technique and interpretation. He then went on to Harold Bauer. Russell also studied organ, composition, orchestration and fugue with Charles Marie Widor and composition with Edgar Stillman Kelley, an American then resident abroad. It was under Kelly that Russell conceived the ambition to become a serious composer.

In 1908 Russell made his concert pianist debut with marked success. Returning to America that fall, he toured the country as a pianist, both by himself and as a joint recitalist with other artists including tenor Reinald Werrenrath, soprano Florence Hinkle and future colleague at Princeton University John Barnes Wells.

== Association with Wanamaker ==
On May 31, 1910, Russell was made concert director and organist for the Wanamaker New York Store. In addition to daily organ recitals at the Austin Organ at the Wanamaker Store, he also oversaw musical instrument sales, particularly pianos, and organizing musical performances by employees and outside groups.

By 1919, he became responsible for major Wanamaker organ concerts at both the New York and Philadelphia stores. The same year, Russell was responsible for organizing the gala after-hours recital to rededicate the greatly enlarged Wanamaker Organ, now at 17,000 pipes and still the largest organ in the world at the time. He chose Charles M. Courboin, Leopold Stokowski and the Philadelphia Orchestra to perform. The concert was a great success, attracting a capacity audience of between 12,000 and 15,000 listeners, and lead to the formation of the Wanamaker Concert Bureau, led by Dr. Russell.

Russell's deportment allowed him to move in patrician and music circles. His capacity to secure backing from the Wanamaker family allowed success and a far-reaching influence to the Wanamaker programs. It also allowed him, with the assistance of his associate Bernard LaBerge, to attract organ luminaries to perform at the Wanamaker stores. These included Marcel Dupré, Charles M. Courboin, Louis Vierne, Marco Enrico Bossi, Alfred Hollins, Marcel Lanquetuit, Nadia Boulanger, G.D. Cunningham , and Fernando Germani. Dr. Russell's Wanamaker Concert Bureau made arrangements for recitals in the Eastern US, while Mr. Laberge did likewise for the Western US and Canada.

Dr. Russell also participated in the creation of the John Wanamaker memorial Founder's Bell, and The Cappella, Rodman Wanamaker's extensive collection of rare string instruments.

After the major Wanamaker concerts abruptly ended following the death of Rodman Wanamaker in 1928, LaBerge continued the management of concert organists under his own name and that organization, now known as Karen McFarlane Concert Artists, Inc. continues to the present day.

== Teacher ==
Russell was for 20 years (1917–1935) the first Henry Clay Frick Professor of Music and director of music at Princeton University. He was also named resident organist for the 4 manual Aeolian Organ at Proctor Hall, donated in 1916 by Mr. Frick. (The Aeolian was removed in 1963 and replaced with a 2 manual instrument).

By rare diplomacy he achieved great success at Princeton, for he made good music popular among his students. This was not easily accomplished, for it was only by time-honored prejudices could be beaten down. Dr. Russell directed the university glee club which was not dedicated to the singing of the classics. With characteristic tact he made no attempt to change that, but after he had won their confidence he suggested the formation of another organization called the Princeton Choristers. The later organization would sing the best in choral music. Success came slowly but after the first performance was a great success, new members flocked to the Choristers and eventually the officers of the glee club asked that the two organizations be merged. At the time they were known as the Princeton Choristers Glee Club.

In addition Dr. Russell made his lectures in music appreciation one of the most popular courses in the curriculum even though students gained no graduation credits for attending. He also held Sunday afternoon organ recitals which were very well attended.

In the 1920s Russell chaired a committee that designed the famous 4 manual Ernest M. Skinner organ at the 2,000-seat Princeton University Chapel designed by Ralph Adams Cram.

Russell was chosen to play the organ for the funeral of Thomas Alva Edison in 1931.

Russell died at his home in DeWitt, New York on November 24, 1953.

== Composer ==
While on vacation at the St. Lawrence Seaway, Canada he composed a suite of four descriptive organ pieces entitled the St. Lawrence Scetches. They are occasionally played today.

1. The Citadel at Quebec
2. The Bells of St. Anne de Beaupré
3. Song of the Basket Weaver
4. Up The Saguenay

== For listening ==
- YouTube The Bells of St. Anne de Beaupré with score, featuring organist Lloyd Holzgraf at First Congregational Church, Los Angeles, CA.

== Archives ==
Russell's papers, consisting of music scores, are held by the Alexander Russell Collection of Syracuse University Library

== Honors ==
Syracuse University granted him an honorary Mus. Doctorate in 1921 which was followed in 1929 by a Doctor of Pedagogy from the Cincinnati Conservatory. He was also named a Chevalier of the Order of the Crown of Belgium in 1932.

== Legacy ==
Dr. Russell deserves credit for securing Wanamaker patronage for the elaborate store concerts, both in New York and Philadelphia between 1919 and Rodman Wanamaker's death in 1928. Through his advocacy, a number of important European artists were introduced to America, including Marcel Dupré, Louis Vierne, Marco Enrico Bossi, Nadia Boulanger, Fernando Germani, Alfred Hollins and G.D. Cunningham. He also had an important role in the pipe organs at the Wanamaker stores, the Aeolian organ in the Frick Residence, and the Princeton Chapel E.M. Skinner pipe organ. His papers, including unpublished works, are held by Syracuse University, in the city where he and his wife were buried.
