= Wanamaker Organ =

World's largest fully functioning pipe organ

Coordinates: 39.9515°N 75.1622°W

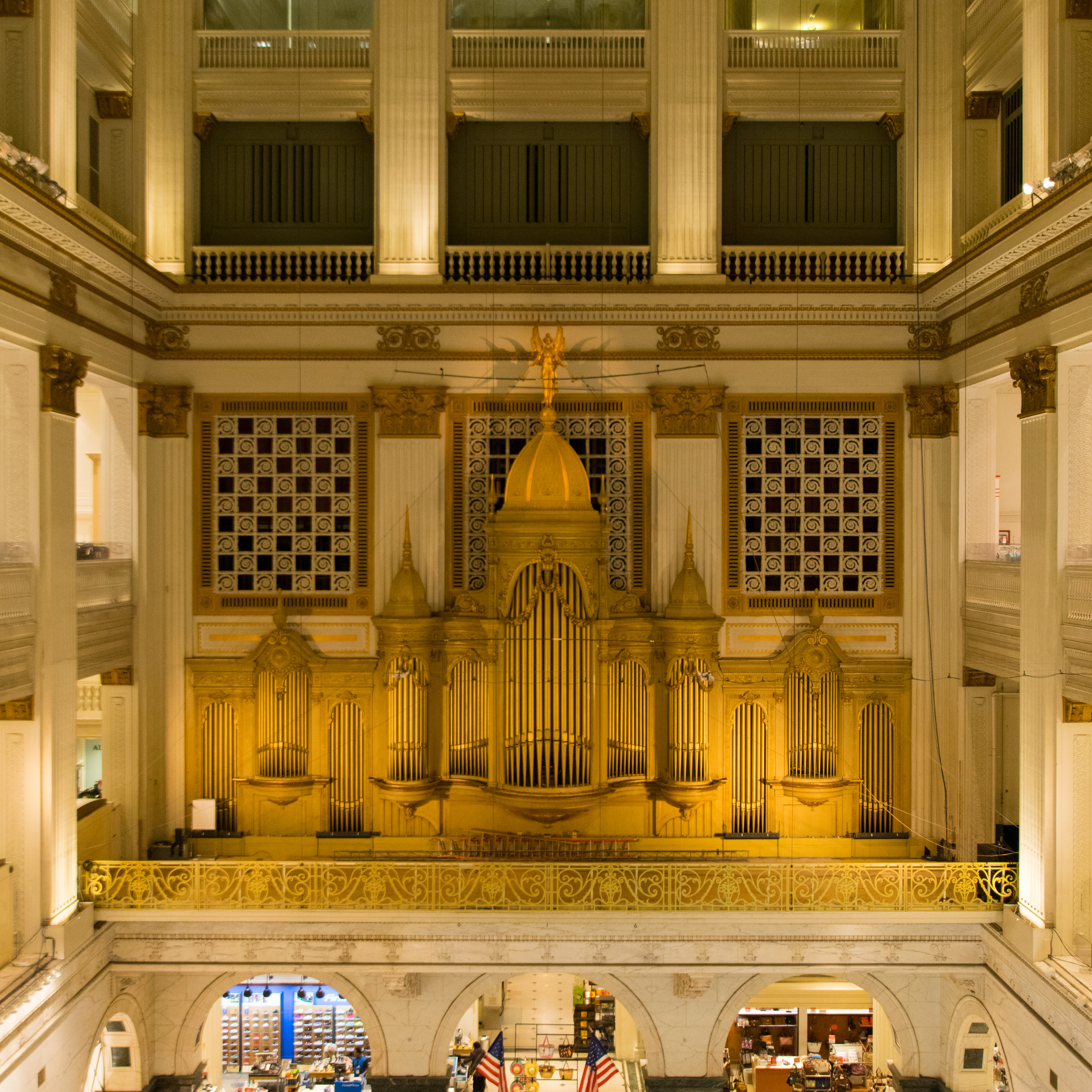
The display pipes of the Wanamaker Organ. These pipes are decorative only. The pipes that sound are behind and above them. Store architect Daniel Hudson Burnham designed the organ casework.

The Wanamaker Grand Court Organ, located in Philadelphia, Pennsylvania, is the largest fully functioning pipe organ in the world, based on the number of playing pipes, the number of ranks and its weight. The Wanamaker Organ is located within a spacious 7-story Grand Court at the John Wanamaker Store (originally Wanamaker's and most recently Macy's) and was played twice a day Monday through Saturday. The organ was featured at several special concerts held throughout the year, including events featuring the Friends of the Wanamaker Organ Festival Chorus and Brass Ensemble.

== Notable characteristics ==
The Wanamaker Organ is the largest pipe organ in the world when measured by the number of ranks and its weight. It is a concert organ of the American Symphonic school of design, which combines traditional organ tone with the sonic colors of the symphony orchestra. In its present configuration, the instrument has 28,762 pipes in 465 ranks.

The organ console consists of six manuals with an array of stops and controls that command the organ. The organ's String Division fills the largest single organ chamber in the world. The division features eighty-eight ranks of string pipes built to Wanamaker specifications by the W.W. Kimball Company of Chicago.

A large pipe organ is meant less for sheer volume than for the many smaller ensembles it can form, and its size leaves room for rare and experimental stops with unusual tone colors.

The organ is known for its orchestra-like sound, coming from pipes intended for another setting that are voiced softer than usual, allowing an unusually rich build-up because of the massing of pipe-tone families. The organ was also built and enlarged as an "art organ", using skilled craftsmanship and expensive materials to create a product beyond what is generally commercially available.

The design uses little borrowing or unification except in the Pedal and Orchestral divisions, and duplexing is used only where a solo voice can be played apart from its division without tying up the rest of it. Its choruses (16', 8', 4') are built from three separate ranks, each with its own character, rather than a single rank electrically "tapped" at three pitches as in a unified organ.

The Wanamaker Store kept its own organ workshop on site, and two curators were employed to look after the organ. Ownership of the store later passed from the Wanamaker family to Carter Hawley Hale Stores followed by Woodward & Lothrop, The May Department Stores Company, and Lord & Taylor. After Macy's took over the space and the Friends of the Wanamaker Organ was founded, bringing in outside money, a regular restoration program began.

== History ==
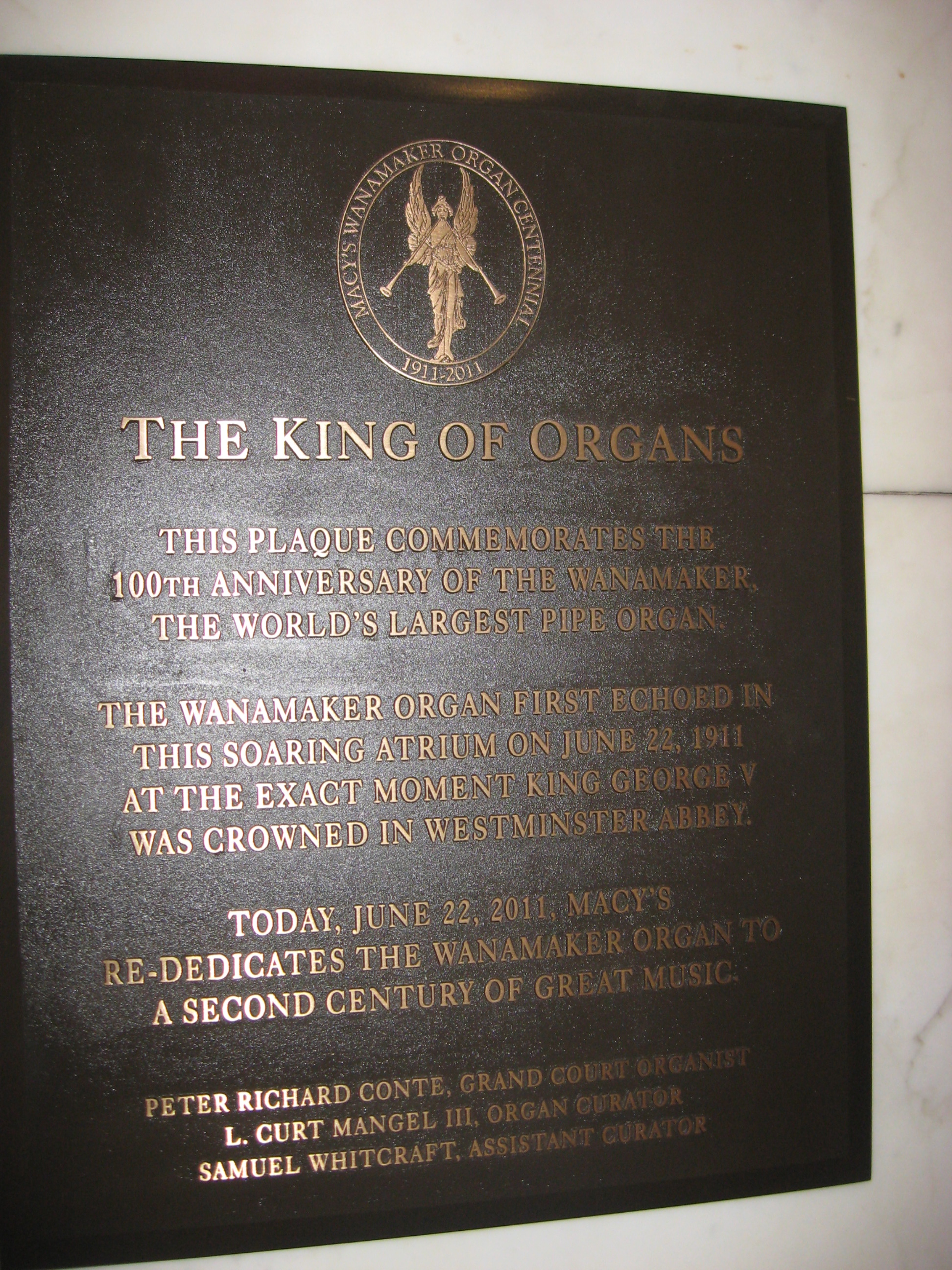
The Wanamaker Organ centennial plaque

The Wanamaker Organ was originally built by the Los Angeles Art Organ Company, successors to the Murray M. Harris Organ Co., for the Kansas City Convention Hall. Before it was placed there, it was exhibited at the 1904 St. Louis World's Fair. It was designed to be the largest organ in the world, an imitation of a full-size orchestra with particularly complete resources of full organ tone including mixtures. In addition to its console, the organ was originally equipped with an automatic player that used punched rolls of paper, according to the Los Angeles Times of 1904. It was built to a specification by renowned organ theorist and architect George Ashdown Audsley. Wild cost overruns plagued the project, with the result that Harris was ousted from his own company. With capital from stockholder Eben Smith, it was reorganized as the Los Angeles Art Organ Company, and finished at a cost of $105,000 (equal to $3,762,500 today), $40,000 over budget, equal to $1,433,333 today. The Fair began (in late April 1904) before the organ was fully installed in its temporary home, Festival Hall. Although the organ's debut was scheduled for May 1, official fair organist and St. Louis local Charles Henry Galloway did not give his opening recital until June 9. The organ was still not entirely finished in September of that year, when Alexandre Guilmant, one of the most famous organists of the day, presented 40 very well-attended recitals on the organ.

Following the Fair, the organ was intended for permanent installation at the Kansas City Convention Center. Indeed, the original console had a prominent "KC" on its music rack. This venture failed, saddling the L. A. Art Organ company with debt after the Fair closed. The firm was reorganized as the Electrolian Company under principal shareholder Eben Smith.There was a plan to exhibit the organ at Coney Island in New York City, but nothing came of this.

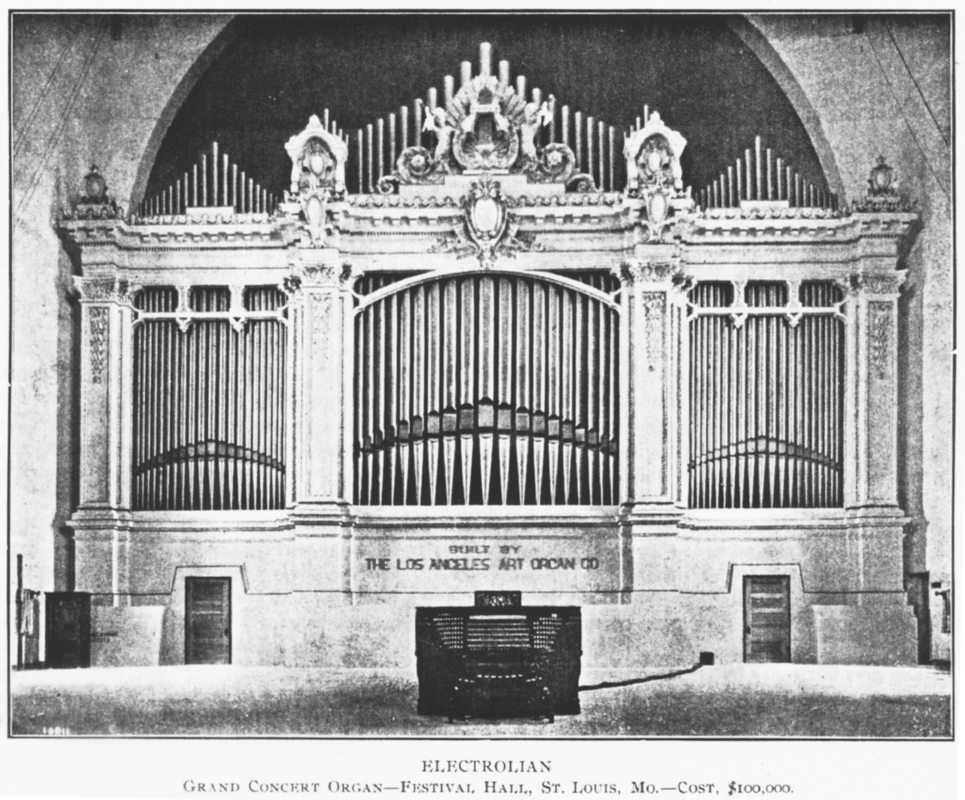
The organ in its original place of exhibition, the 1904 World's Fair. This facade was formerly installed at Macy's; it used to be behind the current facade.

The organ languished in storage at the Handlan warehouse in St. Louis until 1909, when it was bought by John Wanamaker for his new department store at 13th and Market Streets in Center City, Philadelphia. It took thirteen freight cars to move it to its new home, and two years for installation. It was first played on June 22, 1911, at the exact moment when British King George V was crowned. It was also featured later that year when U.S. President William Howard Taft dedicated the store.

Despite its then-unprecedented size (more than 10,000 pipes), it was judged inadequate to fill the seven-story Grand Court in which it was located, so Wanamaker's opened a private organ workshop in the store attic, which was charged with enlarging the organ. The first project to enlarge the organ was the addition of 8,000 pipes between 1911 and 1917.

Wanamaker's sponsored many historic after-business-hours concerts on the Wanamaker Organ. The first, in 1919, featured Leopold Stokowski and the Philadelphia Orchestra with organist Charles M. Courboin. Every sales counter and fixture was removed for the free after-hours event, which attracted an audience of 15,000 from across the United States. Subsequently, more of these "Musicians' Assemblies" were held, as were private recitals. For these events Wanamaker's opened a Concert Bureau under Alexander Russell and brought to America master organists Marcel Dupré and Louis Vierne, Nadia Boulanger, Marco Enrico Bossi, Alfred Hollins, and several others. (This agency, which worked in partnership with Canadian Bernard R. LaBerge, evolved into the Karen McFarlane Concert Agency of the present day.) During his first recital on the organ, Dupré was so impressed with the instrument that he was inspired to improvise a musical depiction of the life of Jesus Christ. This was later published as his Symphonie-Passion.

From April 24, 1922, to 1928 the store had its own radio station, WOO, and music from the organ was a major feature of the broadcasts.

In 1924, a new project to enlarge the organ began. Marcel Dupré and Charles M. Courboin were among those asked by Rodman Wanamaker, John Wanamaker's son, to "Work together to draw up a plan for the instrument. Use everything you have ever dreamed about." They were told there was no limit to the budget. This project resulted in, among other things, the String Division, which occupies the largest organ chamber ever constructed, 67 feet long, 26 feet deep, and 16 feet high (22 by 9 by 5 m). During this project, the organ's current console was constructed in Wanamaker's private in-house pipe-organ workshop, with six manuals and several hundred controls. By 1930, when work on expanding the organ finally stopped, the organ had 28,482 pipes, and, if Rodman Wanamaker had not died in 1928, the organ would probably be even bigger.

Plans were made for, among others, a Stentor division, a section of high-pressure diapasons and reeds. It was to be installed on the fifth floor, above the String Division, and would be playable from the sixth manual. However, it was never funded, and the sixth manual is now used to couple other divisions or play various solo voices from other divisions that are duplexed to this keyboard.

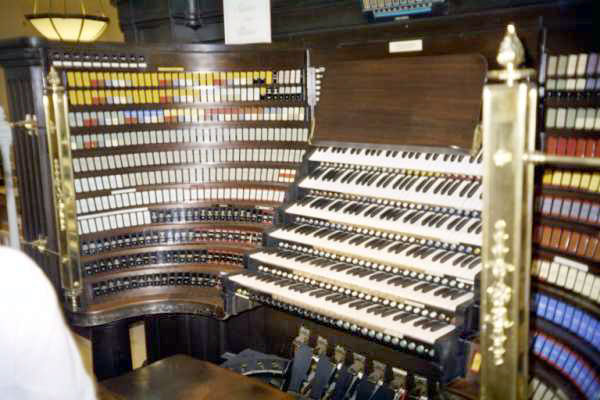
The organ's six-manual console

Rodman Wanamaker also wanted the organ built to a high standard, with finely crafted pipes and chests made from high-quality materials. The Wanamaker Organ console, built in the store organ shop by William Boone Fleming, has heavy, durable construction, a unique layout of its pneumatic stop action and many unconventional features and conveniences. Wanamaker also had a collection of 60 rare stringed instruments, the Wanamaker Cappella, that were used in conjunction with the store organs in Philadelphia and New York, and went on tour. They were dispersed after his death.

Following the sale of the store to The May Department Stores Company, in 1995, the Wanamaker's name was removed from the store (first as Wanamaker-Hecht's) in favor of Hecht's, but the organ and its concerts were retained. During the local renaming of the Hecht's stores to Strawbridge's, the historic Wanamaker Store briefly took the name of its longtime rival Strawbridge's. The May Company began a complete restoration of the organ in 1997, as part of the store's final May Co. conversion into a Lord & Taylor. At that time the store area was reduced to three floors and additional panes of glass were put around the Grand Court on floors four and five, which increased the reverberation of the room.

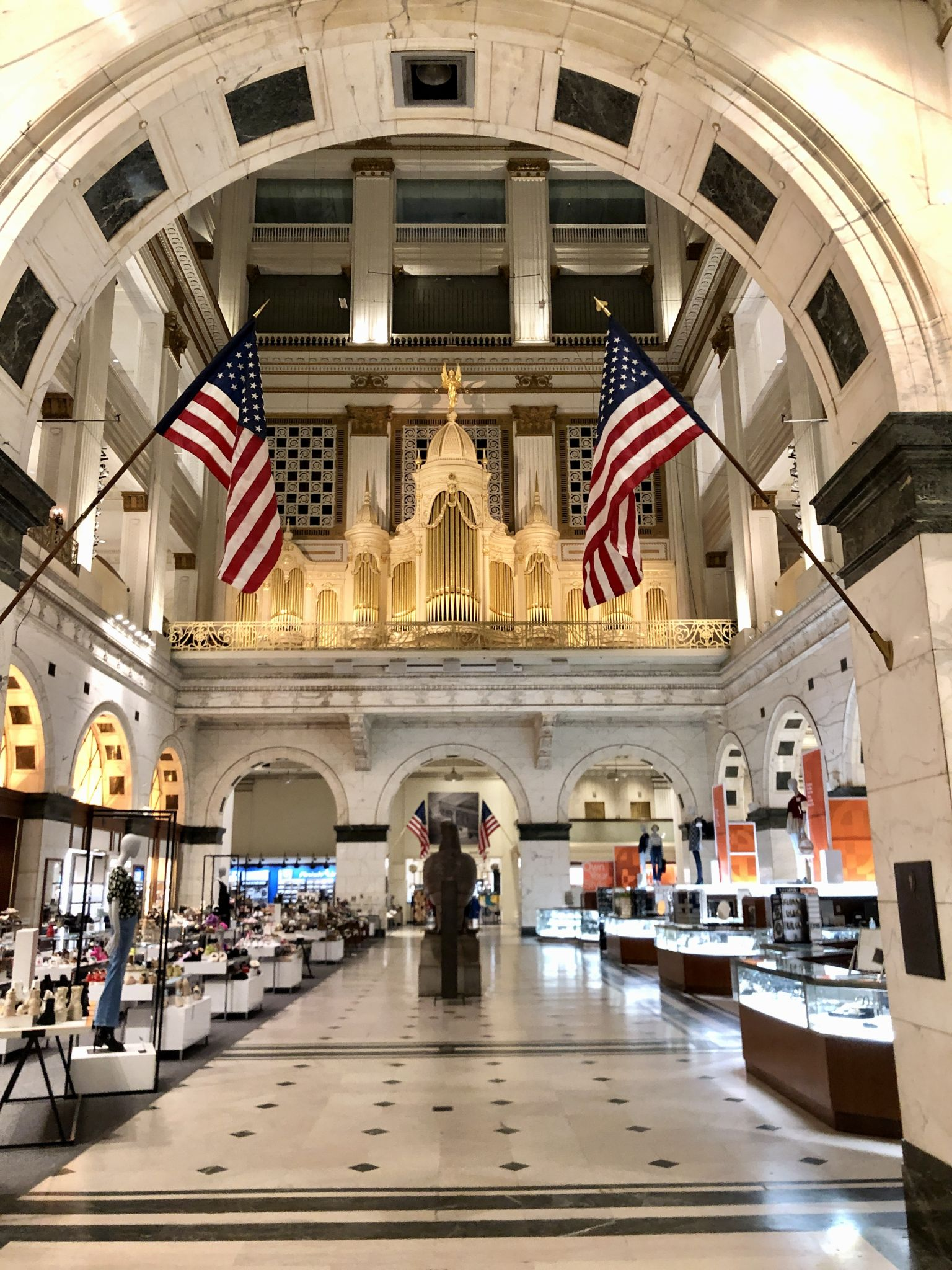
The Wanamaker Organ in the Grand Court

The Philadelphia Orchestra returned to the Grand Court on September 27, 2008, for the premiere performance of Joseph Jongen's Symphonie Concertante (1926) on the organ for which it was written. The ticketed event, featuring soloist Peter Richard Conte, also included the Bach/Stokowski arrangement of the Toccata and Fugue in D minor, Marcel Dupré's Cortege and Litany for Organ and Orchestra, and the world premiere of a Fanfare by Howard Shore, composer for The Lord of the Rings films. Shore visited the store in May 2008 to meet with Peter Richard Conte and hear the Wanamaker Organ. The Philadelphia Orchestra Concert was co-sponsored by the Friends of the Wanamaker Organ and was a benefit for that organization.

In 2019 the Wanamaker Organ facade, designed by Daniel Hudson Burnham, was restored and re-gilded in 22-karat gold to a color scheme close in sympathy to its original appearance but which fits in with its new surroundings. Evergreene Architectural Arts did the work. Grant money from Macy's and several Philadelphia area charities funded this project, which was overseen by the Friends of the Wanamaker Organ.

In January 2025, Macy's announced the closing of 66 stores by March 2025 which included the Center City location where the organ is located. The organ is protected as a National Historic Landmark and cannot be taken down or moved. The new owner of the building, TF Cornerstone, has stated that it is “committed to the preservation of the organ and ensuring it remains a cherished part of the space.” As of October 2025, the organ is performed in occasional concerts open to the public.

=== Organists ===
Although numerous famous organists have played special concerts on the organ, it has had only four chief organists in its history:

- Dr. Irvin J. Morgan (1911–1917)
- Mary E. Vogt (1917–1966)
- Dr. Keith Chapman (1966–1989)
- Peter Richard Conte (1989–present)

For about a decade beginning in 1919, Dr. Charles M. Courboin was the organist for a series of special evening concerts, including several collaborations with the Philadelphia Orchestra. Courboin also headed the Wanamaker Organ Shop in the late 1920s.

=== Noteworthy assistant organists ===
- Dr. Richard L. Elliott (Chapman)
- Ken Cowan (Conte)
- Nathan Laube (Conte)
- Michael Stairs (Chapman, Conte)

=== Present curator ===
- Curt Mangel III

=== Music inspired by or written for the Wanamaker Organ ===
==== Original compositions ====
- Premiére Symphonie "Passion" en ré mineur pour Grand-Orgue, op. 23 by Marcel Dupré. Originally improvised.
- Concerto Gregoriano by Pietro Yon
- Concerto Romano by Alfredo Casella
- Dedicace by Louis Vierne, dedicated to Rodman Wanamaker
- Symphonie Concertante for organ and orchestra by Joseph Jongen
- Fanfare and Procession by Keith Chapman
- "A Highland Ayre" from "Scottish Folk Tone Poems" by Richard Purvis (written for the Wanamaker Organ at the request of Keith Chapman)
- Cathedral of Commerce by Robert Hebble

==== Arrangements of existing music ====
- "Come Sweet Death" by J. S. Bach, arranged after Stokowski by Virgil Fox
- Leopold Stokowski's organ-orchestra transcription of Bach's Passacaglia in C Minor
- Transcription of Mussorgsky's Pictures at an Exhibition by Keith Chapman
- Transcription of Mussorgsky's Night on Bald Mountain by Peter Richard Conte
- Transcription of Dukas' The Sorcerer's Apprentice by Peter Richard Conte
- Transcription of Nicolai's Overture to The Merry Wives of Windsor by Peter Richard Conte
- Transcription of Elgar's Cockaigne Overture by Peter Richard Conte
- Transcription of Bernstein's "Overture to Candide" by Peter Richard Conte
- Transcription of the Elgar Enigma Variations by Peter Richard Conte
- Transcription of "Der Rosenkavalier Suite" by Peter Richard Conte
- Transcription of Arthur Sullivan's The Yeomen of the Guard Overture by Peter Richard Conte
- Improvisation on a Stokowski-theme by Xaver Varnus

== Architectural layout ==
The pipes are laid out across the space occupied by five floors of the building, with the sections situated as follows:

- 2nd floor south – Main Pedal 32 ft, Lower Swell, Great, Percussions
- 3rd floor south – Main Pedal, Chorus, Upper Swell, Choir/Enclosed Great, Solo, Vox Humana Chorus
- 4th floor south – String
- 4th floor west – Orchestral (adjacent to String)
- 7th floor south – Major Chimes, Ethereal, Chinese Gong
- 7th floor north – Echo

The 32 ft Wood Open, 32 ft Diaphone, and 32 ft Metal Diapason pipes run the length of a little more than 2 stories, beginning on the second floor.

== Stoplist ==
=== Main Organ ===
I Choir(C-c4 - 61 pipes)
Double Dulciana	16 ft
Dulciana	8 ft
Open Diapason	8 ft
Violin Diapason	8 ft
Stopped Diapason	8 ft
Concert Flute	8 ft
Salicional	8 ft
Quintadena	8 ft
Vox Angelica	8 ft
Vox Celeste	8 ft
Keraulophon	8 ft
Forest Flute	4 ft
Salicet	4 ft
Piccolo	2 ft
Soft Cornet VI
Saxophone	16 ft
Saxophone	8 ft
English Horn	8 ft
Clarinet	8 ft

II Great(C-c4 - 61 pipes)
Unenclosed Great
Sub Principal	32 ft
Contra Gamba	16 ft
Double Diapason	16 ft
Sub Quint	10 2/3 ft
Diapason Phonon	8 ft
Diapason Major	8 ft
First Diapason	8 ft
Second Diapason	8 ft
Third Diapason	8 ft
Fourth Diapason	8 ft
Gamba (2 ranks)	8 ft
Major Tibia	8 ft
Mezzo Tibia	8 ft
Minor Tibia	8 ft
Double Flute	8 ft
Nasard Flute (2 ranks)	8 ft
Octave	4 ft
Mixture VIII
Harmonic Trumpet	8 ft
Enclosed Great
Covered Tibia	8 ft
Harmonic Flute	8 ft
Quint	5 1/3 ft
Harmonic Flute	4 ft
Principal	4 ft
Tierce	3 1/5 ft
Octave Quint	2 ft
Super Octave	2 ft
Mixture VII
Double Trumpet	16 ft
Tuba	8 ft
Trumpet	8 ft
Harmonic Clarion	4 ft
Great Chorus (73 pipes)
Diapason Magna	8 ft
Stentorphone	8 ft
First Diapason	8 ft
Second Diapason	8 ft
Third Diapason	8 ft
Major Flute	8 ft
Double Flute	8 ft
Gamba	8 ft
Flute	4 ft
Octave	4 ft
Nasard	2 2/3 ft

III Swell(C-c4 - 61 pipes)
Double Diapason	16 ft
Soft Bourdon	16 ft
Stentorphone	8 ft
Horn Diapason	8 ft
Violin Diapason	8 ft
Bell Flute	8 ft
Orchestral Flute	8 ft
Harmonic Flute	8 ft
Grand Flute (2 ranks)	8 ft
Double Flute	8 ft
Tibia Dura	8 ft
Clarabella	8 ft
Melodia	8 ft
Soft Dulciana	8 ft
Gamba Celeste (2 ranks)	8 ft
Gamba	8 ft
Quint Bourdon	5 1/3 ft
Harmonic Flute (2 ranks)	4 ft
First Octave	4 ft
Second Octave	4 ft
Nazard (prepared for)	2 2/3 ft
Harmonic Piccolo	2 ft
Corroborating Mixture V
Mixture VI
Bass Tuba	16 ft
Bass Trombone	16 ft
Contra Fagotto	16 ft
Double Oboe Horn	16 ft
Trombone	8 ft
Tuba	8 ft
Fagotto	8 ft
Oboe	8 ft
Trumpet	8 ft
Horn	8 ft
Bassett Horn	8 ft
Clarinet	8 ft
Clarinet (2 ranks)	8 ft
Vox Humana (2 ranks)	8 ft
Harmonic Clarion	4 ft
Musette	4 ft
Original String Division
Contra Bass	16 ft
Violoncello	8 ft
Viol	8 ft
Viol (sharp)	8 ft
Viola	8 ft
Quint Viol	5 1/3 ft
Octave Viol	4 ft
Violina	4 ft
Tierce	3 1/5 ft
String Mixture V
Viol Cornet IV

IV Solo(C-c4 - 61 pipes)
Double Open Diapason	16 ft
Grand Viol	16 ft
First Diapason	8 ft
Second Diapason	8 ft
Third Diapason	8 ft
Violin Diapason	8 ft
Viol	8 ft
Viol	8 ft
Harmonic Flute	8 ft
Tierce Flute (2 ranks)	8 ft
Chimney Flute	8 ft
Clarabella	8 ft
Gemshorn	8 ft
Nasard Gamba (2 ranks)	8 ft
Grand Gamba	8 ft
Grand Gamba	8 ft
Quintaphon	8 ft
Quint Diapason	5 1/3 ft
Octave	4 ft
Harmonic Flute	4 ft
Harmonic Tierce	3 1/5 ft
Twelfth Harmonic	2 2/3 ft
Piccolo Harmonic	2 ft
Double Trumpet	16 ft
Tuba	16 ft
Trumpet	8 ft
Soft Tuba	8 ft
Cornopean	8 ft
Ophicleide	8 ft
Musette	8 ft
Ophicleide	4 ft
Soft Tuba	4 ft
Grand Mixture VI
Mixture V
Mixture VI

Pedal(C-g1 - 32 pipes)
Gravissima	64 ft
Contra Diaphone	32 ft
First Contra Open Diapason	32 ft
Second Contra Open Diapason	32 ft
Contra Bourdon	32 ft
Diaphone	16 ft
First Open Diapason	16 ft
Second Open Diapason	16 ft
Third Open Diapason	16 ft
Bourdon	16 ft
Violone	16 ft
Gamba	16 ft
Open Flute	16 ft
Soft Bourdon	16 ft
Dulciana	16 ft
Open Quint	10 2/3 ft
Stopped Quint	10 2/3 ft
Stentor	8 ft
Open Diapason	8 ft
Octave	8 ft
First Tibia	8 ft
Second Tibia	8 ft
Octave Soft Bourdon	8 ft
First Cello	8 ft
Second Cello	8 ft
Soft Flute	8 ft
Soft Dulciana	8 ft
Principal	4 ft
Octave	4 ft
First Tibia	4 ft
Second Tibia	4 ft
Flute	4 ft
Mixture VI
Mixture VII
Mixture VIII
Grand Mutation ×
Contra Trombone	32 ft
Contra Bombarde	32 ft
Bombarde	16 ft
Trombone	16 ft
Tuba	16 ft
Euphonium	16 ft
Contra Fagotto	16 ft
Bombarde	8 ft
Octave Fagotto	8 ft
Tromba	8 ft
Clarion	4 ft

=== Ethereal Organ ===
V Ethereal(73)
Bourdon	16 ft
First Open Diapason	8 ft
Second Open Diapason	8 ft
Clear Flute	8 ft
Harmonic Flute	8 ft
Double Flute	8 ft
Quint Flute	8 ft
Grand Gamba	8 ft
Grand Gamba	8 ft
Octavo	4 ft
Harmonic Flute	4 ft
Twelfth Harmonic	2 2/3 ft
Harmonic Piccolo	2 ft
Mixture IV
Tuba Profunda	16 ft
Tuba Mirabilis	8 ft
French Trumpet	8 ft
Grand Clarinet	8 ft
Post Horn	8 ft
Tuba Clarion	4 ft

VI Stentor(73)
Cello 1 (String)	8 ft
Cello 1 ♯ (String)	8 ft
Cello 1 ♭ (String)	8 ft
Cello 2 (String)	8 ft
Cello 2 ♯ (String)	8 ft
Cello 2 ♭ (String)	8 ft
Nasard Gamba II (String)	8 ft
Nasard Gamba II ♯ (String)	8 ft
Clear Flute (Ethereal)	8 ft
Clear Flute (Ethereal)	4 ft

Ethereal Pedal(32)
Acoustic Bass	32 ft
Diapason	16 ft
Bombarde	16 ft
Bombarde	8 ft

=== Echo Organ ===
Echo(73) (floating)
Bourdon	16 ft
Open Diapason	8 ft
Violin Diapason	8 ft
Stopped Diapason	8 ft
Night Horn	8 ft
Clarabella	8 ft
Melodia	8 ft
Orchestral Viol	8 ft
Soft Viol	8 ft
Soft Viol	8 ft
Unda Maris (2 ranks)	8 ft
Open Quint	5 1/3 ft
Octave	4 ft
Harmonic Flute	4 ft
Mellow Flute	4 ft
Cornet Mixture V
Mixture VI
Double Trumpet	16 ft
Trumpet	8 ft
Capped Oboe	8 ft
Euphone	8 ft
Vox Humana	8 ft

Echo Pedal(32)
Open Diapason	16 ft
Stopped Diapason	16 ft

=== Orchestral Organ ===
Orchestral(73) (floating)
Contra Quintadena	16 ft
Duophone	8 ft
Tibia	8 ft
Covered Tibia	8 ft
Concert Flute	8 ft
Harmonic Flute	8 ft
Mellow Flute	8 ft
String Flute	8 ft
Double Flute	8 ft
Hollow Flute	8 ft
Harmonic Flute	4 ft
Orchestral Flute	4 ft
Covered Flute	4 ft
Octave	4 ft
Harmonic Piccolo	2 ft
Super Octave	2 ft

Orchestral Reeds(73) (floating)
English Horn	16 ft
Bass Clarinet	16 ft
Bass Saxophone	16 ft
Bassoon	16 ft
English Horn	8 ft
Orchestral Clarinet	8 ft
Saxophone	8 ft
Orchestral Bassoon	8 ft
Bassett Horn	8 ft
Oboe	8 ft
Orchestral Oboe	8 ft
Orchestral Trumpet	8 ft
Kinura	8 ft
Muted Cornet	8 ft

Orchestral French Horns(73) (floating)
First French Horn	8 ft
Second French Horn	8 ft
Third French Horn	8 ft

Vox Humana Chorus(73) (floating)
Vox Humana	16 ft
First Vox Humana	8 ft
Second Vox Humana	8 ft
Third Vox Humana	8 ft
Fourth Vox Humana	8 ft
Fifth Vox Humana	8 ft
Sixth Vox Humana	8 ft
Seventh Vox Humana	8 ft

Vox Humana Chorus Pedal(32)
First Vox Humana	16 ft
Second Vox Humana	16 ft

=== String Organ ===
String(73) (floating)
Violone	16 ft
First Contra Gamba	16 ft
Second Contra Gamba	16 ft
First Contra Viol	16 ft
Second Contra Viol	16 ft
First Viol	16 ft
Second Viol	16 ft
Violin Diapason	8 ft
Gamba	8 ft
Nasard Gamba (2 ranks)	8 ft
Nasard Gamba (2 ranks)	8 ft
First 'Cello	8 ft
First 'Cello ♯	8 ft
First 'Cello ♭	8 ft
Second 'Cello	8 ft
Second 'Cello ♯	8 ft
Second 'Cello ♭	8 ft
First Orchestral Violin	8 ft
First Orchestral Violin ♯	8 ft
First Orchestral Violin ♭	8 ft
Second Orchestral Violin	8 ft
Second Orchestral Violin ♯	8 ft
Second Orchestral Violin ♭	8 ft
Third Orchestral Violin	8 ft
Third Orchestral Violin ♯	8 ft
Third Orchestral Violin ♭	8 ft
Fourth Orchestral Violin	8 ft
Fourth Orchestral Violin ♯	8 ft
Fourth Orchestral Violin ♭	8 ft
Fifth Orchestral Violin	8 ft
Fifth Orchestral Violin ♯	8 ft
Fifth Orchestral Violin ♭	8 ft
Sixth Orchestral Violin	8 ft
Sixth Orchestral Violin ♯	8 ft
Sixth Orchestral Violin ♭	8 ft
First Muted Violin	8 ft
First Muted Violin ♯	8 ft
First Muted Violin ♭	8 ft
Second Muted Violin	8 ft
Second Muted Violin ♯	8 ft
Second Muted Violin ♭	8 ft

String (continued)
Third Muted Violin	8 ft
Third Muted Violin ♯	8 ft
Third Muted Violin ♭	8 ft
Fourth Muted Violin	8 ft
Fourth Muted Violin ♯	8 ft
Fourth Muted Violin ♭	8 ft
Fifth Muted Violin	8 ft
Fifth Muted Violin ♯	8 ft
Fifth Muted Violin ♭	8 ft
Sixth Muted Violin	8 ft
Sixth Muted Violin ♯	8 ft
Sixth Muted Violin ♭	8 ft
Quint Viol	5 1/3 ft
Quint Viol ♯	5 1/3 ft
First Orchestral Violina	4 ft
First Orchestral Violina ♯	4 ft
Second Orchestral Violina	4 ft
Second Orchestral Violina ♯	4 ft
Tierce Viol	3 1/5 ft
Tierce Viol ♯	3 1/5 ft
Nasard Violina	2 2/3 ft
Nasard Violina ♯	2 2/3 ft
Super Violina	2 ft
Super Violina ♯	2 ft
First Dulciana	8 ft
First Dulciana ♯	8 ft
Second Dulciana	8 ft
Second Dulciana ♯	8 ft
Third Dulciana	8 ft
Third Dulciana ♯	8 ft
Fourth Dulciana	8 ft
Fourth Dulciana ♯	8 ft
Fifth Dulciana	8 ft
Fifth Dulciana ♯	8 ft
Sixth Dulciana	8 ft
Sixth Dulciana ♯	8 ft
First Octave Dulciana	4 ft
First Octave Dulciana ♯	4 ft
Second Octave Dulciana	4 ft
Second Octave Dulciana ♯	4 ft
Dulciana Mutation V

String Pedal(32)
Contra Diaphone	32 ft
Contra Gamba	32 ft
Diaphone (ext)	16 ft
Gamba (ext)	16 ft
First Violone	16 ft
Second Violone	16 ft
Viol	16 ft
Viol ♯	16 ft
Diaphone (ext)	8 ft
Gamba (ext)	8 ft
First Violone (ext)	8 ft
Second Violone	8 ft
Viol	8 ft
Viol ♯	8 ft
Violone	4 ft
Mutation Diaphone	16 ft
Mutation Viol	16 ft
Mutation Viol	10 2/3 ft
Mutation Viol	8 ft
Mutation Viol	5 1/3 ft
Mutation Viol	4 ft
Mutation Viol	2 2/3 ft
Mutation Viol	2 ft
Mutation Viol	1 3/5 ft
Mutation Viol	1 1/3 ft
Mutation Viol	4/5 ft
Grand String Pedal Mixture XII	32 ft

=== Stentor Division ===
Tuba Magna (from 8 ft)	16 ft
Tuba Magna	8 ft

=== Percussion Division ===
Percussion
Major Chimes	C–c1
Minor Chimes	G–g
Metalophone	C–C2
Celesta (by Mustel of Paris)	C–c2
Piano I	(prepared for)
Piano II	standard 88 notes
Harp I	tenor C–c2
Harp II	(prepared for)
Gongs	tenor C–C2 (now playable)
Crescendo Cymbal
Cymbalstar, a memorial to Virgil Fox
Chinese Gong (84" diameter)

== Recordings ==
- The Grand Court Organ (1973) by Keith Chapman. It included a number of works demonstrating the full organ
- Mussorgsky's Pictures at an Exhibition. 1975, the recording is of Keith Chapman's own transcription of the piano suite
- Airs & Arabesques (1976) explored the softer colors of the instrument to marvelous effect
- Virgil Fox Plays the Wanamaker Grand Court Organ (1964, 2004).
- Keith Chapman – The Lost Radio Broadcasts - Vantage V2CD-698-002
- Xaver Varnus' concert
- Magic! (2001) By Peter Richard Conte
- Wanamaker Legacy (2004) by Peter Richard Conte
- A Grand Celebration: Peter Richard Conte with The Philadelphia Orchestra, recorded 2008
- Wanamaker Organ Centennial Concert: Peter Richard Conte with the Symphony in C, Rossen Milanov, conductor. Recorded 2011. Also available on DVD.
- Midnight in the Grand Court (2004) by Peter Richard Conte
- Christmas in the Grand Tradition by Peter Richard Conte with the Philadelphia Brass Ensemble
- My Heart at Thy Sweet Voice by Peter Richard Conte with Andrew Ennis, Flugelhorn
- Around the Wanamaker Organ in 80 Minutes, Wanamaker DVD (A DVD tour of the organ)
- A Wanamaker Organ Curators Tour through the entire instrument on DVD with curator Curt Mangel and MPR host Michael Barone (Pipedreams).
- A Wanamaker Organ Sonic Odyssey tonal exploration of the entire instrument on DVD with Peter Richard Conte and Yale Organist Thomas Murray.

== See also ==
- Curtis Organ
- Boardwalk Hall Auditorium Organ
- Mannequin (1987 film) - Andrew McCarthy plays on the organ in one scene in the film.

== Notes and references ==
- Biswanger, Ray (1999). Music in the Marketplace: The Story of Philadelphia's Historic Wanamaker Organ. The Friends of the Wanamaker Organ Press. ISBN 0-9665552-0-1.
