= Frederick Swann =

American organist and choral conductor (1931–2022)

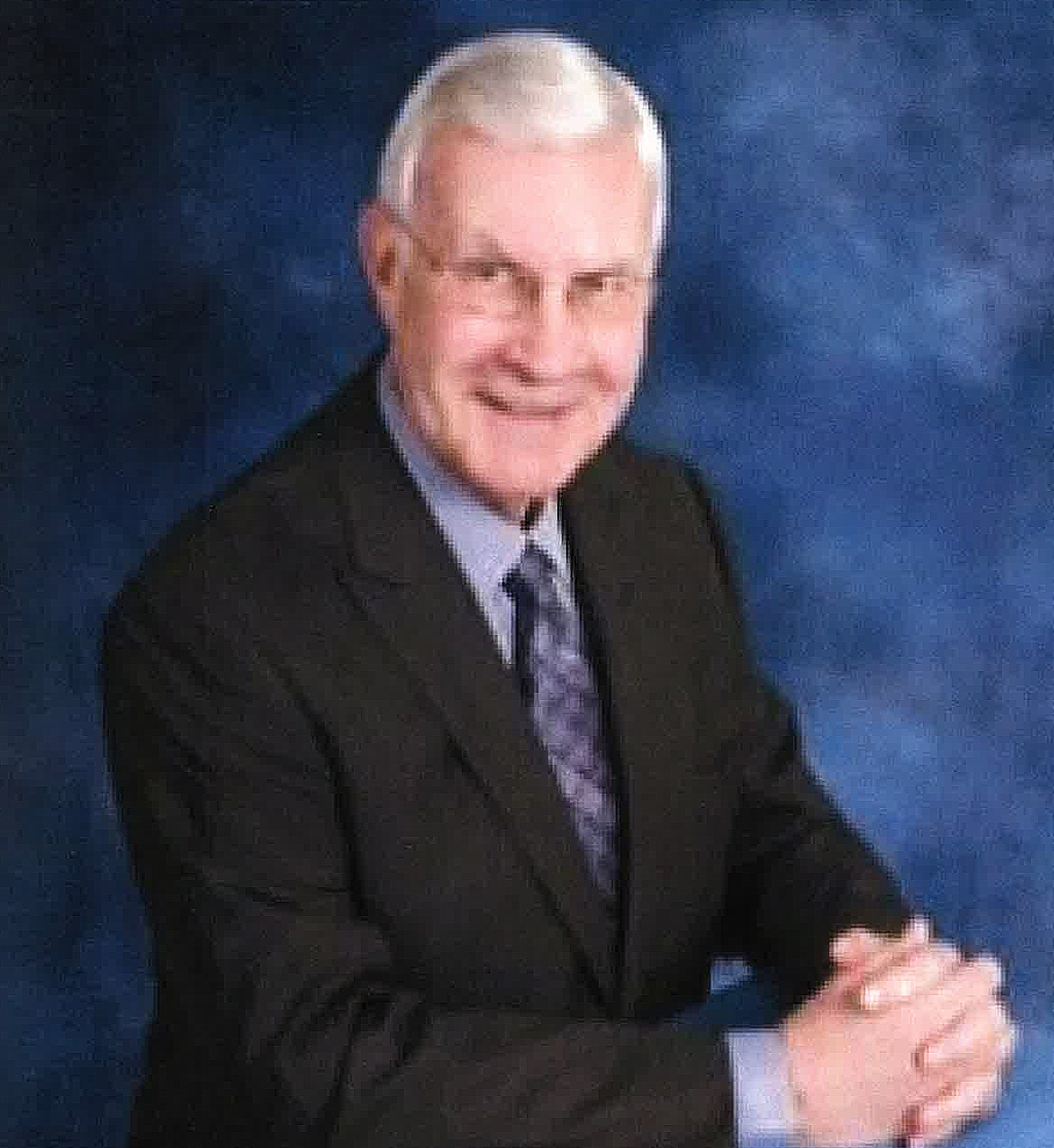
- Born: July 30, 1931; Lewisburg, West Virginia, U.S.
- Died: November 13, 2022 (aged 91); Palm Desert, California, U.S.
- Education: Northwestern University; Union Theological Seminary
- Occupations: Organist; Composer; Choral Director
- Years active: 1941–2022
- Organizations: American Guild of Organists
- Television: Hour of Power (1982–1998)
- Awards: Edward Hansen Award for Outstanding Leadership (American Guild of Organists); Honorary doctorate (University of Redlands)

Frederick Lewis Swann (July 30, 1931 – November 13, 2022) was an American church and concert organist, choral conductor, composer, and president of the American Guild of Organists. His extensive discography includes both solo organ works and choral ensembles he has conducted.

Swann began playing the organ for church services as a ten-year old at a Methodist church in Winchester, Virginia, where his father was pastor. He graduated from Northwestern University with a degree in music and later studied at the School of Sacred Music of Union Theological Seminary in New York City. One of the best-known organists of the 20th and early 21st century, Swann was the former Director of Music and Organist at New York City's Riverside Church and Organist Emeritus of the Crystal Cathedral and the First Congregational Church of Los Angeles. Playing the Crystal Cathedral organ on the weekly Hour of Power television program, he was seen by an estimated audience of twenty million viewers in 165 countries.

Swann lived in Palm Desert, California, where he was Artist-in-residence at St. Margaret's Episcopal Church from 2001 until his death in 2022. He was also formerly University Organist and Organ Professor at the University of Redlands prior to his retirement in 2018.

== Early years and education ==
Frederick Swann was born in Lewisburg, West Virginia, in 1931, shortly before his family moved to Virginia. The son of Methodist pastor (and later bishop) Theodore M. Swann and Mary Davis Swann, he is one of six children. His oldest brother, Edgar, an organist and ordained clergyman, was killed in a glider accident while serving as a World War II Army chaplain on February 19, 1944, and is buried at Arlington National Cemetery.

Swann began taking piano lessons as a 5-year old from the organist at Market Street Methodist Church in Winchester, Virginia. One day he arrived early for a lesson and saw his teacher playing the organ. He told an interviewer in later years that he was "mesmerized when I saw the organ console for the first time" and soon began taking organ lessons. When he was ten years old, the organist at Braddock Street Methodist Church in Winchester, where his father was pastor (1937–1943), died suddenly. Young "Freddie" (as he was then known), was called upon to play the organ for the Sunday services. Until then, he was not tall enough for his feet to reach the pedals. Madeline W. Riley, the church's Minister of Music, was of significant influence in helping him develop the service playing skills for which he has become so well known. In a 2014 interview in The Diapason magazine, Swann recalled his excitement playing on Easter Sunday, when he was allowed to use the Moller organ's "great big Open Diapason" for the first time, saying, "I thought, 'This is heaven', since I had not been allowed to make that much noise before".

The Swann family moved to Staunton, Virginia, in 1943 and the youthful organist continued organ study with Dr. Carl Broman, professor of music at Mary Baldwin College and organist at Trinity Episcopal Church. It was at that church that Swann was captivated by the denomination's liturgy and music, becoming confirmed in the Episcopal church at age 13. As a 15-year old, Swann was already playing the organ for special events at various venues, such as an Easter Sunday afternoon concert at St. Paul's Evangelical United Brethren Church in Staunton, accompanying the church's choir and guest soloists from Shenandoah College.

After graduating from Robert E. Lee High School, where he played the piano for the school's chorus, Swann attended Northwestern University's School of Music. He chose the college on the shores of Lake Michigan, he would say years later, because "... my childhood was not the happiest, and at that point in my life, the farthest place away that I had heard of was Chicago. With my Methodist background and it being a Methodist school, I won a scholarship and went there". While at Northwestern, Swann studied with Thomas Matthews (1915–1999), who inspired him as a teacher and from whom he learned much about improvisation and colorful organ registration at the acclaimed E. M. Skinner organ of nearby St. Luke's Episcopal Church. He also studied with John Christensen, the organist at the First Methodist Church in Evanston, where Swann served as assistant organist during his four years in college.

After earning his degree in music from Northwestern University, Swann attended the old School of Sacred Music at Union Theological Seminary in New York City, where he studied with Hugh Porter (1897–1960), the School's director. He also studied with Charles M. Courboin, organist at the time at St. Patrick's Cathedral. Both degrees were granted "with distinction". Living in New York at the time, he recalled, exposed him to a plethora of great church music around town: on any given Sunday afternoon, one could hear choral programs and concerts at such prominent venues as St. Thomas Church or St. Bartholomew's. After a 15-month stint as interim organist at New York's Brick Presbyterian Church during the illness of the renowned Clarence Dickinson, while concurrently serving as Harold Friedell's assistant at St. Bartholomew's, Swann entered the U.S. Army for a two-year stint.

== Career as an organist ==
Swann was associated with the music ministry of the famed Riverside Church in New York City from 1952 through 1982, first as a substitute organist for Virgil Fox and then appointed Organist in 1957, when Fox's appearances at Riverside became infrequent until his departure in 1965 to pursue a full-time career as a concert performer. Upon the retirement of Richard Weagly as Choir Director in 1966, Swann became Director of Music and Organist through 1982. Under the direction of Swann, Riverside's music program flourished in the 1960s–1980s. He directed the 75-voice paid choir from the organ bench for Sunday services and oratorios, such as Ralph Vaughan Williams's Hodie and Stabat Mater by Polish composer Karol Szymanowski. In discussing his approach to organ registration for such works, he said, "On any instrument, I explore every stop in the organ, and of course, with a large organ, it is important to find orchestral colors for the oratorio accompaniments. I always feel that if there's a stop there, it's supposed be used and you can usually find a way to do it." Riverside's musical excellence continued under his successor as music director and organist, John Walker.

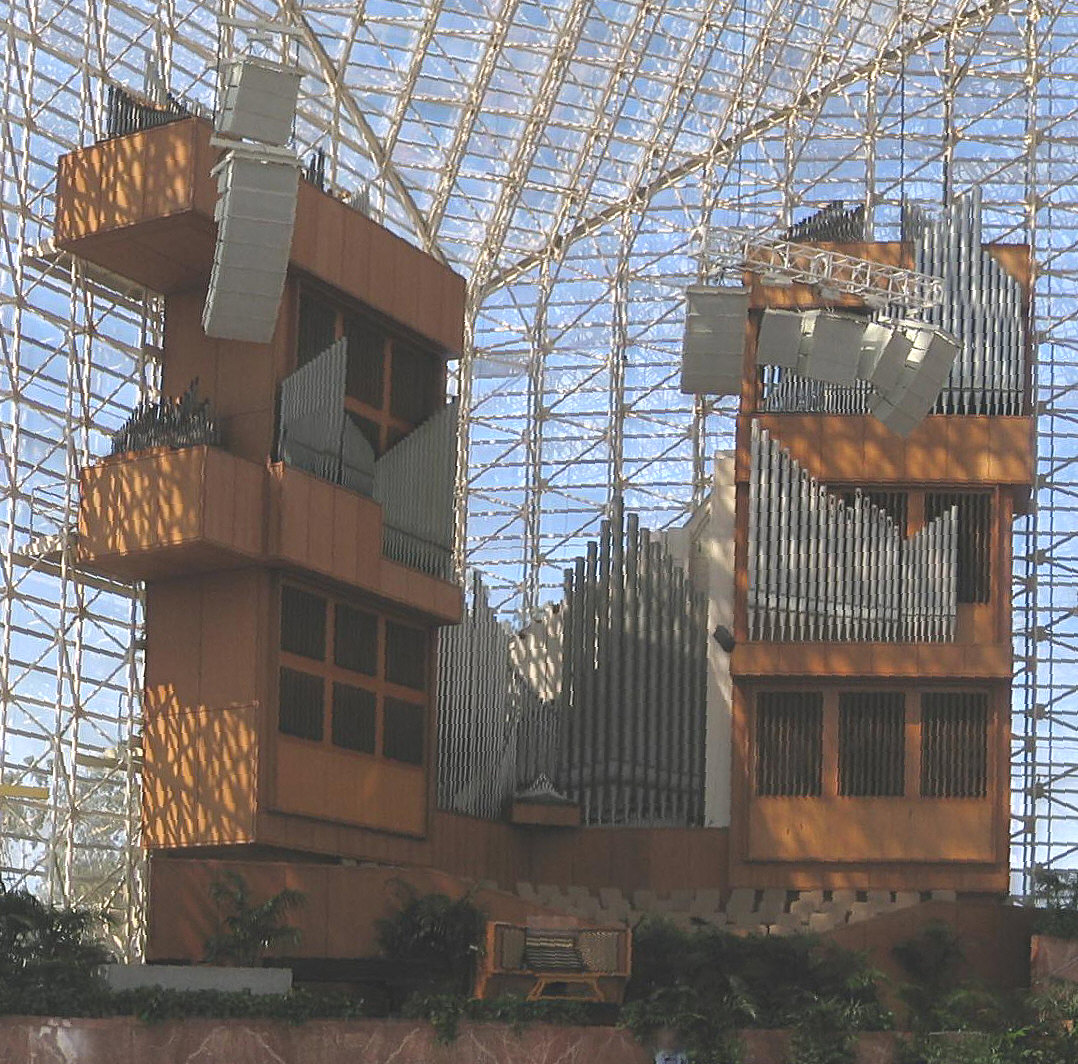
The Crystal Cathedral organ

Beginning in June 1982, Swann was appointed Director of Music and Organist at the Crystal Cathedral (now Christ Cathedral) in Garden Grove, California, where he conducted the choir and presided over the 5-manual, 265-rank Hazel Wright organ of 16,000 pipes, appearing weekly on the internationally televised Hour of Power worship services. He was seen by an estimated audience of twenty million viewers in 165 countries. Swann also performed at weekly noonday recitals and major concerts. His performances were characterized by music critic Daniel Cariaga as "splendid, probing, brilliant and entertaining". Swann told the Los Angeles Times years later that he was initially criticized in some professional organist quarters for leaving the prestigious, Gothic cathedral-like Riverside Church in New York for the Crystal Cathedral, saying he was "practically blackballed", but that he felt quite comfortable with his decision and found the Christian theology at both churches differing only in emphasis.

Swann then began serving as organist of the First Congregational Church of Los Angeles in September 1998, playing the largest church organ in the world. The instrument has more than 20,000 individual pipes. Swann delighted in playing the gargantuan organ there, saying, "The congregation just loved that organ and would remain motionless and utterly quiet during preludes and postludes". He left this position on July 30, 2001 – his 70th birthday.

As a concert organist, he has performed at recitals throughout North America, Europe, South America, and Asia. Past appearances include Notre Dame Cathedral in Paris, St Paul's Cathedral and Westminster Abbey in London, and Cologne and Passau Cathedrals in Germany. Swann has performed over 3,000 recitals in his long career – in all 50 states of the U.S. and 12 other countries.

Swann is known for dedicating new organs in churches, concert halls, and auditoriums during his career, such as Orchestra Hall in Chicago, Illinois, with the Chicago Symphony in 1981 and at Davies Symphony Hall in San Francisco, California, with the San Francisco Symphony in 1984. On September 9, 2003, he dedicated the largest church organ in Asia, located in YounDong Presbyterian Church, in Seoul, Korea, having 104 stops, 119 ranks, and 6,820 pipes. The following year, on September 30, 2004, Swann was chosen to perform the inaugural concert of the 6,125-pipe organ of the Los Angeles Philharmonic at Walt Disney Concert Hall. A month later, he performed at the largest pipe organ in the island nation of Bermuda, playing the 88-rank organ of St. Paul's Anglican Church there in a concert broadcast by Sacred Classics.

At age 85 in 2016, Swann announced his retirement as a concert organist with a series of programs beginning in August of that year at the Kotzschmar Organ in Portland, Maine. His performance was praised by music critic Allan Kozinn of the Portland Press Herald as possessing a "commanding sense of pace and color". Swann's playing of Bach's Prelude and Fugue in G (BWV 541) was called "masterly ... notable for both the vigor he brought to the Prelude and the textural transparency with which he illuminated the fugue". His final recital on the retirement tour took place at the First Presbyterian Church of Kilgore, Texas, fittingly on the 50th anniversary of his dedicatory recital on that very organ.

Swann died at his home in Palm Desert, California, on November 13, 2022, at the age of 91. He continued to serve as Artist-in-residence at St. Margaret's Episcopal Church in Palm Desert, California, until his death. A memorial service for Swann was held at St. Margaret's on January 25, 2023 with music by the St. Margaret's Choir, and organists David Higgs, Nathan Laube, and Todd Wilson.

== Teaching ==
Swann served on the adjunct faculties of New York City's Guilmant Organ School, the Union Theological Seminary School of Sacred Music, and Teacher's College of Columbia University. For ten years, he chaired the Organ Department of the Manhattan School of Music. In later years, he was University Organist and Artist Teacher of Organ at the University of Redlands in California (2007–2018).

== American Guild of Organists leadership ==
Swann joined the American Guild of Organists (AGO) in 1946. By 1998, a past-president of the AGO, Margaret McElwain Kemper, said of him, "There is no one in the field more respected and well-liked than Fred Swann". After serving in various AGO offices, he was elected in 2002 to the first of three consecutive two-year terms as president of the 25,000-member organization. Also in 2002, he was named "International Performer of the Year" by the New York City Chapter of the AGO. On April 13, 2008, the AGO saluted him at an AGO Gala recital at First Congregational Church in Los Angeles as the "Crown Prince of the King of Instruments" for his "dedicated service ... for more than a half century". At the AGO's July 2010, national convention in Washington, D.C., Swann was presented with the Edward A. Hansen Leadership Award by the organization's vice president, John Walker. In receiving the award, conferred biennially for outstanding leadership, Swann said to the thousands of delegates in the audience:

"I am also grateful beyond expression for the friendship and support of a veritable host of AGO members over the years. Because I have been greatly blessed with high-profile professional appointments and opportunities throughout my entire career, I have always felt that it behooved me to do my best to promote the cause of great organ and choral music in as many religious and educational areas as possible . The AGO has been an excellent vehicle for me to do this."

== Critical acclaim and awards ==
Critics such as Tim Smith have called Swann "one of the country's most distinguished organists". Other critics have praised his playing as "brilliant". The New York Times said his performance at a Riverside Church recital in 2006, "demonstrated that organists are complete athletes, needing both lightning-fast fingers and the fleet footwork of a dancer".

In 2015, the Royal Canadian College of Organists named Swann a Fellow, honoris causa and in 2018 the AGO honored him as the organization's first honoris causa recipient of its "Fellow" degree (i.e., FAGO). Following eleven years as organist and organ professor at the University of Redlands, Swann received the honorary Doctor of Music degree from the California university upon his retirement in April 2018.

The organ in the Arboretum at Christ Cathedral is named the Frederick Swann Organ in his honor. Comprising 82 ranks and 4,949 pipes, the 1948 Aeolian-Skinner organ was originally at Beverly Hills' First Church of Christ Scientist, but was removed following severe damage to that church in the 1994 Northridge earthquake. It was eventually installed in the Arboretum building on the Crystal Cathedral's campus, under Swann's guidance.

In 2019, George C. Baker composed Berceuse sur le nom de SWANN, an organ work honoring its namesake. In it, Baker assigns the notes "C-G-A-F-F" to represent Swann's name as the recurrent motif of the piece. It was premiered by Swann on December 8 of that year at St. Margaret’s Episcopal Church. It was subsequently performed by organist Christopher Creaghan at Riverside Church on January 10, 2021.

== Published works ==
Swann's published compositions include more than three dozen anthems for choir, such as Let the Whole Creation Cry, as well as numerous organ works based on hymn tunes, such as Hymns of Praise and Power. His arrangements of familiar hymns include Amazing Grace, Great is Thy Faithfulness, How Great Thou Art, Fairest Lord Jesus and O God Our Help in Ages Past. His widely performed Trumpet Tune in D Major was composed in 1991. When a magazine writer complimented him for his "wonderful" Trumpet Tune, Swann replied with characteristic modesty, "I don’t know how wonderful it is, but people seem to enjoy it". Of his choral anthems, composed while he was at the Crystal Cathedral, he said they were written "because I couldn’t find what I wanted to fit with the service of the day or they were not the right length. They all had to be written in major keys, had to be loud, and had to end with the sopranos on high C, so there isn’t a great deal of variety. But the publishers wanted them: because I was the organist at the Crystal Cathedral, and they thought they would sell".

Swann's discography of organ and choral recordings includes:

Riverside Church

- The Riverside Years – Organ
- The Riverside Years, Vol. 2 – Choir
- Riverside Revisited
- Music from Riverside (4 LP volumes)
- Easter: "The Way to Emmaus" (with Louise Natale, soprano soloist)
- Christmas at Riverside
- God of Grace and God of Glory (hymns and choral anthems)
- Swann plays Franck at Riverside Church

Crystal Cathedral

- Four Masterworks for Organ
- Hymns on the Crystal Cathedral Organ
- O Magnify the Lord (Choir, organ, and carillon)
- Sing We Now of Christmas (Choir)
- We Sing the Power (Choir)

First Congregational Church, Los Angeles

- The Great Organs of First Church
- Hymns of Vaughan Williams (choir conducted by Thomas Somerville)

Basilica of the National Shrine of the Immaculate Conception

- Swann at the Organ of the National Shrine
- The Mystic Organ

Hawaii

- Frederick Swann In Hawaii Vol. 1
- Frederick Swann In Hawaii Vol. 2
