= Adolf Frey =

Adolf Frey may refer to:

- Adolf Frey (writer) (1855–1920), Swiss writer and literary historian
- Adolf Frey (composer) (1865–1938), German-born American composer
- Adolf Frey (footballer), Swiss footballer
