= Mary Watson Weaver =

American poet

Mary Eliza Watson Weaver (January 16, 1903 – November 16, 1990) was an American composer, pianist, and poet who was born in Kansas City, Missouri.

== Life ==
Mary received B.A. and B. M. degrees from Smith College (Massachusetts) and Ottawa University (Kansas). She continued to study music with Rosario Scalero and Deems Taylor at the Curtis Institute of Music (Philadelphia), and privately in New York and France.

Mary married composer and organist Powell Weaver on March 24, 1938, and they had one son (Thomas Watson Weaver). She gave lectures and recitals, and taught piano at the Kansas City Conservatory, the Curtis Institute, the University of Missouri–Kansas City (1946 – 1957), the Manhattan School of Music (New York; 1957 – 1970), and the Henry Street School of Music (New York).

== Compositions ==
Mary's compositions were published by Belwin-Mills, G. Schirmer Inc., Galaxy Music Corporation, and Shawnee Press. She collaborated with her husband on some compositions (noted below), and he set some of her poems to music. Her musical compositions, all for voice, include:

- All Weary Men (with Powell Weaver; mixed chorus; 1949)
- Confess Jehovah (mixed chorus; 1951)
- "Cradle Song" (text by Padraic Colum; soprano and piano; 1940)
- Enchanted Islands (women's chorus; 1952)
- God's Love Enfold (mixed chorus; 1952)
- Hail, Jesu Bambino (mixed chorus; 1967)
- "Heart of Heaven" (soprano or alto and piano; 1952)
- Kneel Down (unspecified chorus)
- Like Doves Descending (with Powell Weaver; mixed chorus; 1952)
- Like the Young Sheep (mixed chorus; 1950)
- New Mexican Lullaby (women's chorus; 1953)
- O Holy Child (women's chorus; 1952)
- On the Eve of the First Christmas (with Powell Weaver; mixed chorus; 1948)
- Rise Up All Men (mixed chorus; 1953)
- When Jesus Lay by Mary's Side (with Powell Weaver; mixed chorus; 1951)
- Wild Swans
