= Gaston Dethier =

American classical composer

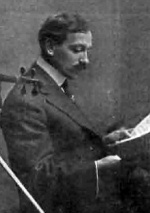
- Gaston Dethier
- Born: 1875; Antwerp, Belgium
- Died: 1958 (aged 82–83); New York City
- Known for: Gaston Dethier, organist, composer

Gaston Marie Dethier (1875 – 1958) was an American organist, pianist, and composer of Belgian birth.

== Early life and education ==
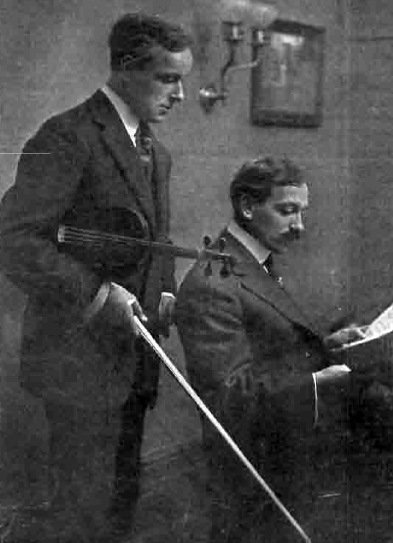
Édouard Dethier (left) with his brother, Gaston Dethier (right)

Born in Liège, Dethier was the son of organist Emile Jean Joseph Dethier (1849-1933), the brother of violinist Edouard Dethier, and the uncle of physiologist Vincent Dethier. He studied at the Royal Conservatory in his native city with Alexandre Guilmant. He was awarded premiers prix in organ, piano, harmony, and fugue from the conservatory.

In 1886, at just 11 years of age, Dethier was appointed organist at the Église Saint-Jacques-le-Mineur de Liège. He eventually left there to work in the same capacity at the Église Saint-Christophe de Liège.

== Relocation to United States ==
In 1894, Dethier emigrated to the United States where he eventually became a naturalized citizen. He served as an organist at The Church of St. Francis Xavier from 1894 until 1907. After he left in 1907, the position was filled by Italian organist Pietro Yon who would eventually become organist at St. Patrick's Cathedral.

== Juilliard School ==
He taught organ on the faculty of the Juilliard School from 1907 until 1945. Among his notable pupils were Ray Lev, Marcelle Martin, Carl McKinley, Georges-Émile Tanguay, and Powell Weaver. In the early 1920s he also provided private instruction on the piano to the aspiring young composer and organist Paul Creston.

Dethier is best remembered today as the composer of a set of Variations on 'Adeste Fideles' (1902) which is occasionally performed today.
