= Powell Weaver =

- Born: 1890; Clearfield, Pennsylvania
- Died: 1951 (aged 60–61); Kansas City, Missouri
- Known for: organist, composer

Powell Weaver (1890–1951) was an American composer, organist, pianist who was active in the midwest during the early 20th century and who wrote some organ pieces that are included in recitals today.

== Early life ==
Powell Weaver was born on June 10, 1890, in Clearfield, Pennsylvania. He attended Clearfield High School and then the Institute of Musical Art (now the Juilliard School) in New York. His teachers were organ, Gaston Dethier, composition, Marjorie Goetschius and piano, Carolyn Beebe. He also studied organ privately with Pietro Yon for two years. In Italy his teachers were Composition, Ottorino Respighi and organ with Remigio Renzi. He married composer and organist Mary Watson Weaver on March 24, 1938, and they had one son (Thomas Watson Weaver).

== Professional assignments ==
All of Weaver's professional positions were in the city of Kansas City, Missouri. He was first organist for the Grand Avenue United Methodist Temple from 1918 through 1938 where he presided over the distinguished and venerable 4 manual, Ernest M. Skinner organ described by organist Frederick Hohman as "the oldest original and intact 4 manual Ernest M. Skinner Organ (1912)". He then went on to be organist and director of music for the First Baptist Church (1938-1951) and also Temple B'nai Jehudah.

== Composer ==
Weaver is best remembered for his organ works which include:

- The Squirrel
- Bell Benedictus
- The Cuckooo
- Exultation: piéce symphonique, for organ and piano
- Copper Country Sketches
- Transcription for organ of Toccata by Pietro Domenico Paradies

He also collaborated on some choral works with his wife:

- Like Doves Descending (with Mary Watson Weaver; mixed chorus; 1952)
- On the Eve of the First Christmas (with Mary Watson Weaver; mixed chorus; 1948)
- When Jesus Lay by Mary's Side (with Mary Watson Weaver; mixed chorus; 1951)

Piano music:

- Don Quixote visits Viena: Humoresque for piano (1936)

== Death ==
Powell died on December 22, 1951, in Oakland, California.
