= Hazel Wright Organ =

Pipe organ in Garden Grove, California, US

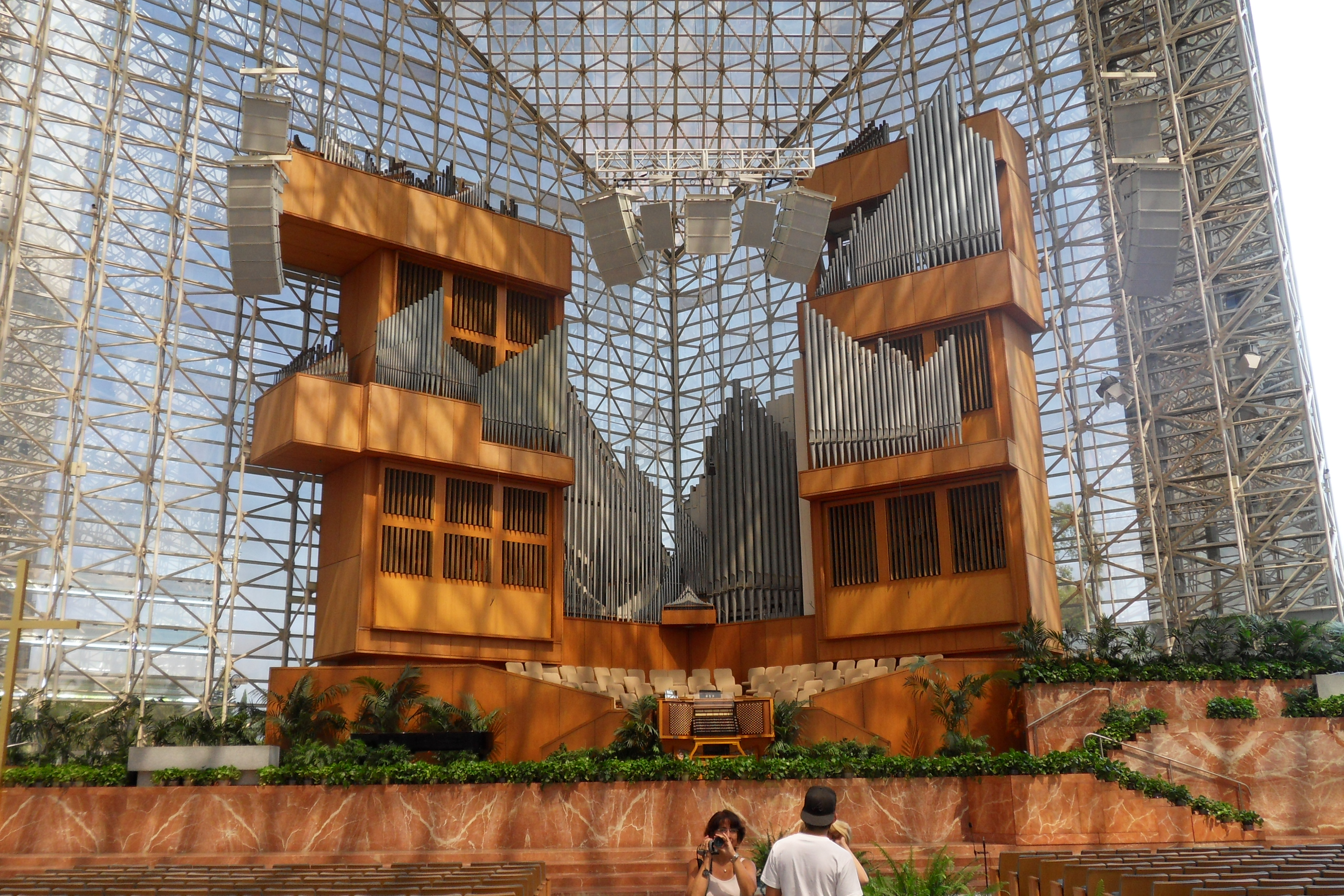
The main section of the Hazel Wright Organ, in Crystal Cathedral, prior to restoration and refurbishment in Christ Cathedral.

The Hazel Wright Organ is a pipe organ in Christ Cathedral in Garden Grove, California, US. It is one of the world's largest pipe organs. As of 2019, it has 293 ranks and 17,106 pipes, fully playable from two 5-manual consoles. The organ is called "Hazel" by fans.

Before becoming Christ Cathedral, the building was known as The Crystal Cathedral, from which the Hour of Power was telecast. Funded by a $2 million gift from Hazel Wright, a viewer of that program, the organ was constructed by Fratelli Ruffatti based on specifications by Virgil Fox and expanded by Frederick Swann. It incorporates the large Aeolian-Skinner pipe organ originally built in 1962 for New York's Avery Fisher Hall, and the Ruffatti organ which had been installed in the church's previous sanctuary in 1977.

Beginning in 1982, the year of the present organ's dedication, Frederick Swann was organist and music director at the church. During his 16-year tenure (1982–1998), he was widely regarded as the most visible organist in the world as people in more than 165 countries worldwide saw and heard him playing the organ on the weekly Hour of Power televised episodes.

Following the Crystal Cathedral's final Hour of Power in June 2013, the organ was scheduled to be dismantled for a $2 million refurbishing, led by Fratelli Ruffatti, and then to be re-installed for the building's planned re-opening as Christ Cathedral. After three decades of use and exposure to heat, sunlight and water damage, the organ was in need of extensive repair. The organ was removed in February 2014 over the course of a week and shipped to Padua, Italy for restoration. The organ was returned to California in May 2016 and reinstalled by early 2020. Ruffati had to pause his work in March 2020 due to the COVID-19 pandemic and return to Italy. After the church spent $3 million, a fifth the cost of a brand new organ, Ruffati completed his work in January 2022 after the end of travel restrictions.

The organ was originally due to be rededicated on May 15, 2020, with a recital by organists Frederick Swann, Paul Jacobs, Hector Olivera, and expected recitals during 2020 include performances by Peter Conte, Chelsea Chen, Olivier Latry, and Stephen Tharp; all events were rescheduled to January 2021 and then canceled, as of October 2020. A concert rededicating the organ finally took place on September 30, 2022, featuring organist Hector Olivera.

== Stoplist ==
The organ has the following stoplist:

I Choir (Second Level, East Tower)
| Gemshorn | 16′ |
| Viola Pomposa | 8′ |
| Viola Céleste | 8′ |
| Cor de Nuit | 8′ |
| Flauto Dolce | 8′ |
| Flauto Céleste | 8′ |
| Prinzipal | 4′ |
| Koppelflöte | 4′ |
| Rohrnasat | 2^{2}/_{3}′ |
| Prinzipal | 2′ |
| Zauberflöte | 2′ |
| Tierce | 1^{3}/_{5}′ |
| Larigot | 1^{1}/_{3}′ |
| Scharff IV |
| Fagotto | 16′ |
| Petite Trompette | 8′ |
| Clarinet | 8′ |
| Fagotto (Fagotto 16′) | 4′ |
Tremulant
| Millennial Trumpet (Gallery Great) | 8′ |
| Harp | 8′ |
| Harp (Harp 8′) | 4′ |

II Great (Third Level, West Tower)
| Montre | 16′ |
| Kontra Geigen | 16′ |
| Bourdon | 16′ |
| Diapason | 8′ |
| Principal Major | 8′ |
| Principal | 8′ |
| Flûte harmonique | 8′ |
| Spitzflöte | 8′ |
| Spitz Céleste | 8′ |
| Gross Quinte | 5^{1}/_{3}′ |
| Oktave | 4′ |
| Oktav | 4′ |
| Flûte Ouverte | 4′ |
| Flûte a Cheminée | 4′ |
| Gross Tierce | 3^{1}/_{5}′ |
| Quinte | 2^{2}/_{3}′ |
Sesquialtera II
Jeu de Tierce II
| Super Octave | 2′ |
| Fifteenth | 2′ |
| Blockflöte | 2′ |
Grand Fourniture II-VII
Ripieno IV
Mixture IV-VI
Cimbalo IV
Zimbel III-V
| Contre Trompette | 16′ |
| Posaune | 16′ |
| Fagotto (Choir) | 16′ |
| Trompette | 8′ |
| Trompete | 8′ |
| Clairon | 4′ |
Chimes
Cembalo

II Gallery Great (Gallery Organ, West Side)
| Grande Montre (Gallery Pedal) | 16′ |
| Holz Principal | 8′ |
| Holzgedeckt | 8′ |
| Octave | 4′ |
| Koppelflöte | 4′ |
| Fifteenth | 2′ |
| Nineteenth | 1^{1}/_{3}′ |
| Twenty-Second | 1′ |
Fourniture V
Zimbel IV
| Contra Trompette | 16′ |
| Trompette | 8′ |
| Clairon | 4′ |
| Millennial Trumpet (en chamade) | 8′ |
| Herald Trumpet (Solo) | 8′ |

II Hoofdwerk (First Level, East Tower)
| Praestant | 8′ |
| Holpijp | 8′ |
| Quintadeen | 8′ |
| Octaaf | 4′ |
| Fluit | 4′ |
| Super Octaaf | 2′ |
Mixtuur V
Scherp IV
| Bazuin | 16′ |
| Trompet | 8′ |

III Swell(First Level, West and East Tower)
| Flûte Courte | 16′ |
| Quintadena | 16′ |
| Gambe (digital) | 16′ |
| Gambe (digital) | 8′ |
| Montre | 8′ |
| Principal | 8′ |
| Viole de Gambe | 8′ |
| Viole Céleste | 8′ |
| Erzahler | 8′ |
| Erzahler Céleste | 8′ |
| Flûte Couverte | 8′ |
| Bourdon | 8′ |
| Flauto Dolce | 8′ |
| Prestant | 4′ |
| Octave | 4′ |
| Flûte à Pavillon | 4′ |
| Cor de Nuit | 4′ |
| Nazard | 2^{2}/_{3}′ |
| Doublette | 2′ |
| Flûte à Bec | 2′ |
| Tierce | 1^{3}/_{5}′ |
| Larigot | 1^{1}/_{3}′ |
| Piccolo | 1′ |
| None | 8/9′ |
Plein jeu III
Ripieno V
Cymbale III
| Bombarde | 16′ |
| Contre Trompette | 16′ |
| Basson | 16′ |
| Première Trompette | 8′ |
| Deuxième Trompette | 8′ |
| Hautbois d’Orchestre | 8′ |
| Hautbois | 8′ |
| Voix Humaine | 8′ |
| Première Clairon | 4′ |
| Deuxième Clairon | 4′ |
Cornet V
Tremulant

III Borstwerk (First Level, West Tower)
| Pörfluit | 8′ |
| Speelfluit | 4′ |
| Gemshoorn | 2′ |
Tertiaan II
Terzcymbel III
Buntcymbel III ?
| Baarpijp | 16′ |
Tremulant

IV Solo (Second Level, West Tower)
Enclosed:
| Gambe | 8′ |
| Gambe Celeste | 8′ |
| Flauto Heroique (Celestial) | 8′ |
| Doppelflöte | 8′ |
| Major Octave | 4′ |
| Orchestral Flute | 4′ |
| Quinte Flûte | 2^{2}/_{3}′ |
| Octave | 2′ |
Harmonics VI
Gross Fourniture III
Cymbel IV
| English Post Horn | 16′ |
(from English Post Horn 8′)
| Trompette Harmonique | 8′ |
| English Post Horn | 8′ |
| English Horn | 8′ |
| French Horn | 8′ |
| Clairon Harmonique | 4′ |
Not enclosed:
| Flûte d’Arvella (Pedal) | 8′ |
| Tuba Magna | 16′ |
| Herald Trumpet | 8′ |
| Millennial Trumpet (Gallery Great) | 8′ |
| Tuba Mirabilis | 8′ |
| Tuba Clairon | 4′ |
Tremulant

V Celestial (Swell) (Gallery, East Side)
| Bourdon Doux | 16′ |
| Flauto Dolce | 16′ |
| Principal | 8′ |
| Viola Pomposa | 8′ |
| Viola Céleste | 8′ |
| Flauto Dolce | 8′ |
| Flauto Céleste | 8′ |
| Flûte à Cheminée | 8′ |
| Principal | 4′ |
| Italian Principal | 4′ |
| Flûte Traversière | 4′ |
Sesquialtera II
| Doublette | 2′ |
| Octavin | 2′ |
Plein jeu V
Cymbale IV
Jeu de Clochette II
| Contre Trompette | 16′ |
| Ranquette | 16′ |
| Trompette | 8′ |
| Cor Anglais | 8′ |
| Cromorne | 8′ |
| Voix Humaine | 8′ |
| Cor de Schuller | 4′ |
| Chalumeau | 4′ |
Tremulant

V Positiv (Fourth Level, East Tower)
| Bourdon (Great) | 16′ |
| Principal | 16′ |
| Rohrflöte | 8′ |
| Prinzipal | 8′ |
| Spillflöte | 4′ |
| Oktav | 4′ |
| Larigot | 2′ |
| Sifflöte | 1^{1}/_{3}′ |
Scharff IV
Terz Zimbel III
| Fagotto (Choir) | 16′ |
| Krummhorn | 8′ |
| Rohr Schalmei | 4′ |
Tremulant
| Tuba Mirabilis (Solo) | 8′ |

String (Swell) (Floating, Gallery, West Side)
| Viola | 16′ |
| Viola Céleste | 16′ |
| Dulciana | 8′ |
| Unda Maris | 8′ |
| Salicional | 8′ |
| Voix Céleste | 8′ |
| Dulcett | 8′ |
| Dulcett Céleste | 8′ |
| Dulciana Céleste | 8′ |
| Muted Viole 1 | 8′ |
| Viole 1 Céleste | 8′ |
| Muted Viole 2 | 8′ |
| Viole 2 Céleste | 8′ |
| Violoncello | 8′ |
| Violoncello Céleste | 8′ |
| Rohrpfeife | 8′ |
| Nachthorn | 4′ |
Tremulant

Gospel (Floating, East Gallery)
| Principal | 8′ |
| Octave | 4′ |
| Super Octave | 2′ |
Mixture IV
| Trompette en Chamade | 16′ |
| Trompette en Chamade | 8′ |
| Trompette en Chamade | 4′ |

Epistle (Floating, West Gallery)
| Principal | 8′ |
| Octave | 4′ |
Mounted Cornet V
Mixture V
| Trompette en Chamade | 32′ |
| Trompette en Chamade | 16′ |
| Trompette en Chamade | 8′ |
| Trompette en Chamade | 4′ |
| Trompette en Chamade | 2′ |

Echo (Swell) (catwalk 40 m)
| Fern Flute | 8′ |
| Vox Amorosa | 8′ |
| Voix Séraphique | 8′ |
| Chœur des Violes | 8′ |
| Divinare | 4′ |
| Rohr Nasat | 2^{2}/_{3}′ |
| Oboe d’Amore | 8′ |
| Anthropoglossa | 8′ |
Tremulant

Percussion C–
Tower Carillon
| Harp (Choir) | 8′ |
| Celesta (Choir) | 4′ |
Glockenstern (Positiv)
Etoile de Grand Martin (Gallery)
Chancel Chimes (Choir, Great)
Gallery Chimes (Celestial)
Rosignol on Pedal I (Gallery)

Pedal (Second Level, West Tower; Fourth Level East Tower)
| La Force | 64′ |
(Ext. Double Diapason 32′)
| Diapason | 32′ |
| Kontra Geigen | 32′ |
(Ext. Great: Kontra Geigen 16′)
| Contre Gambe (Swell) | 32′ |
| Diapente Grave | 21^{1}/_{3}′ |
| Diapason | 16′ |
| Contre Basse | 16′ |
| Contra Basso | 16′ |
| Principal (Great) | 16′ |
| Geigen (Great) | 16′ |
| Montre (Great) | 16′ |
| Principal | 16′ |
| Bourdon | 16′ |
| Subbasso | 16′ |
| Gemshorn (Choir) | 16′ |
| Flûte Courte (Swell) | 16′ |
| Quintadena (Swell) | 16′ |
| Quint | 10^{2}/_{3}′ |
| Octave | 8′ |
| Principal | 8′ |
| Violone | 8′ |
| Geigen | 8′ |
(Ext. Geigen 16′)
| Spitzflöte | 8′ |
| Principal (Positiv) | 8′ |
| Bourdon | 8′ |
(Bourdon 16′)
| Bordone | 8′ |
(Ext. Subbasso 16′)
| Gemshorn | 8′ |
(Ext. Choir: Gemshorn 16′)
| Flûte Courte | 8′ |
(Ext. Swell: Flûte Courte 16′)
| Octave Quinte | 5^{1}/_{3}′ |
| Choralbass | 4′ |
| Octave | 4′ |
| Principal (Positiv) | 4′ |
| Spillflöte | 4′ |
| Spireflöte | 4′ |
| Octave | 2′ |
| Spindleflöte | 2′ |
(Ext. Spindleflöte 4′)
Fourniture IV
Ripieno VI
Acuta II
Grand Cornet IV
| Kontra Posaune | 32′ |
| Contra Fagotto | 32′ |
| Posaune | 16′ |
| Contre Trompette (Great) | 16′ |
| Bombarde (Swell) | 16′ |
| Basson (Swell) | 16′ |
| English Post Horn (Solo) | 16′ |
| Fagotto (Choir) | 16′ |
| Trompette | 8′ |
| Trompette | 8′ |
| Fagotto | 8′ |
(Ext. Choir: Fagotto 16′)
| Krummhorn (Positiv) | 8′ |
| Klarine | 4′ |
(Ext. Trompette 8′)
| Trompete | 4′ |
(Ext. Trompette 8′)
| Rohr Schalmei (Positiv) | 4′ |
| Zink (Positiv) | 2′ |
| Contra Bourdon (Electronic) | 32′ |

Gallery Pedal (Gallery, East side and Center)
| Untersatz | 32′ |
| Montre le Tour | 16′ |
| Open Wood | 16′ |
| Bourdon | 16′ |
| Bourdon Doux (Celestial) | 16′ |
| Viola (String) | 16′ |
| Viola Céleste (String) | 16′ |
| Prestant | 8′ |
| Bourdon | 8′ |
| Viola Céleste II | 8′ |
(Ext. String: Violo Céleste 16′)
| Bas de Choral | 4′ |
| Mixture | 2′ |
| Grand Harmoniques | 32′ |
| Contra Bombarde | 32′ |
| Bombarde | 16′ |
| Contra Trompette (Celestial) | 16′ |
| Trumpet | 8′ |
| Millennial Trumpet (Great) | 8′ |
| Clarion | 4′ |

== Recordings ==
Frederick Swann has recorded two compact discs playing the Crystal Cathedral organ:

- Four Organ Masterworks
- Hymns on the Crystal Cathedral Organ

Peter Baicchi has recorded one CD:

- Organ Under Glass : The Crystal Cathedral Organ

The Crystal Cathedral Choir and organ are heard on the CD We Sing the Power.
