= Los Angeles Art Organ Company =

The Los Angeles Art Organ Company was based, as its name suggests, in Los Angeles, California. The firm built instruments of unusually high quality and was the successor to the Murray M. Harris Organ Co., which was reorganized following Harris's ouster from the company for financial shenanigans. William Boone Fleming was the factory supervisor. The Los Angeles Art Organ Co. operated only from around 1903 to 1905, at which point it was moved to Hoboken, New Jersey and renamed the Electrolian Organ Company, with major stockholder Eben Smith as its president. Smith died shortly thereafter and the company went out of business.

The company was hoping to make major inroads in the lucrative residence-organ market, and had its own roll-playing mechanism that drew crippling patent-infringement lawsuits from the rival Aeolian Company. The greatest accomplishment of the Los Angeles Art Organ Company during its brief lifespan under that name was the completion of the lavish instrument that was on display in Festival Hall at the 1904 St. Louis World's Fair. The instrument, designed by George Ashdown Audsley, was the largest in the world and contained 10,059 pipes. The organ was only partially functional during the first weeks of the fair (due in part to the financial burden the construction was placing on the firm). However, it was played by some of the most famous virtuosos of the time. Most notable is France's Alexandre Guilmant, who played a series of 40 concerts in a six-week period. The organ was extremely well received, and the Los Angeles Art Organ Company was awarded a gold medal from the World's Fair for its construction. This instrument is now installed in Philadelphia, Pennsylvania, and serves as the core of the famous Wanamaker Grand Court Organ.

Another prominent organ by the Los Angeles Art Organ Co. is in Congregation Sherith Israel in San Francisco.
