= Charles M. Courboin =

Belgian musician

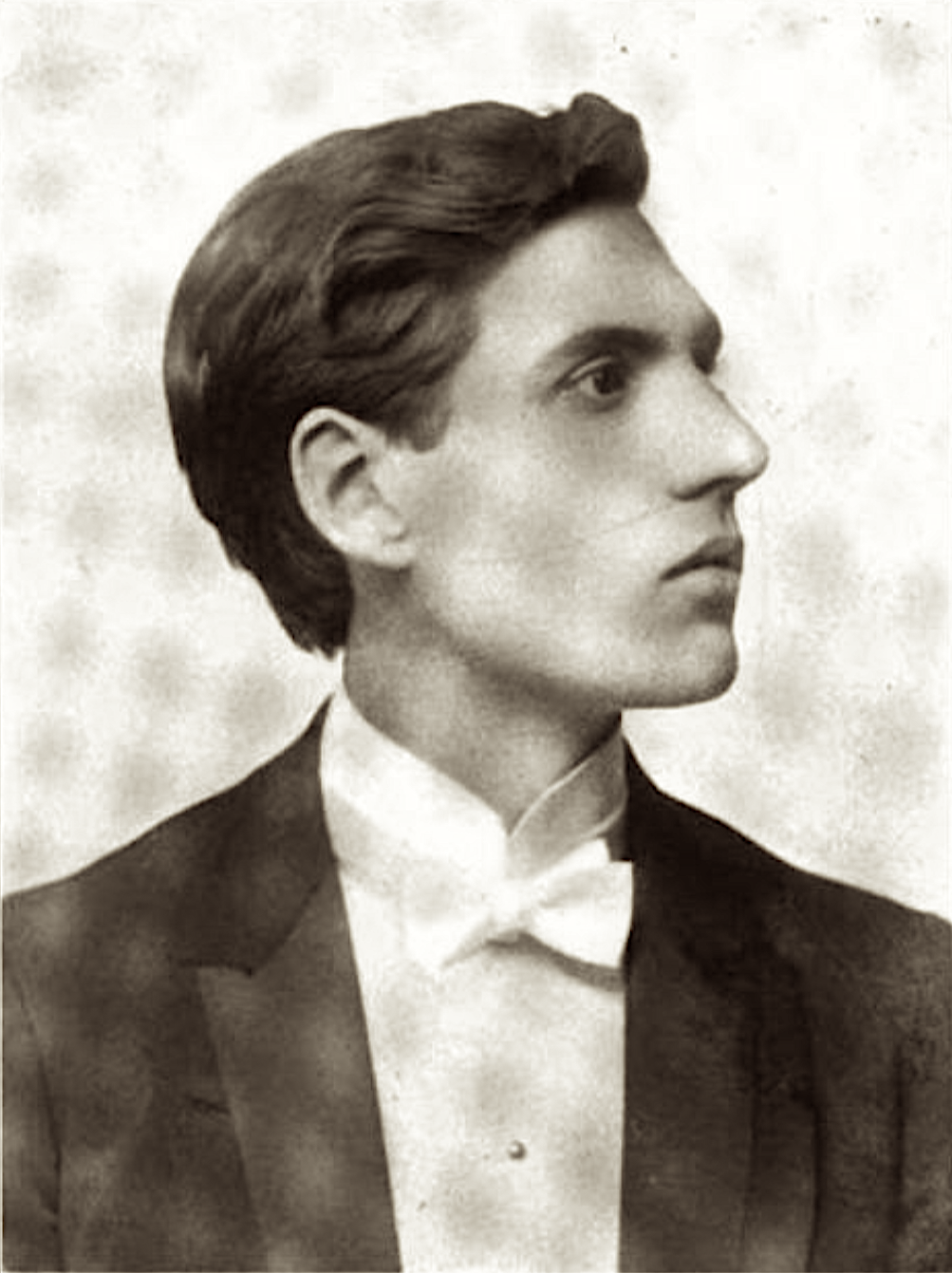
- Charles M. Courboin in 1908
- Born: April 2, 1884; Antwerp, Belgium
- Died: April 13, 1973 (aged 89); New York City, US
- Known for: Charles M. Courboin, organ virtuoso

Charles Marie Courboin (1884–1973) was a Belgian–American organ virtuoso who enjoyed popularity during the 1920s. During this time he was engaged by department store magnate Rodman Wanamaker to oversee the second enlargement of the Wanamaker Organ. He added the huge string and orchestral sections, bringing it to 461 ranks and 28,482 pipes. He also served as director of music for St. Patrick Cathedral, New York City, from 1943 until his retirement in 1968.

== Early history ==
A native of Antwerp, Courboin showed musical aptitude at an early age when he was able to play concertos and symphonies by ear. He studied piano for five years at the conservatory in his birthplace, and at the age of 12 was appointed organist at Notre Dame College in the same city. Later he concentrated on the organ, which he studied under Alphonse Mailly at the Brussels Conservatoire. There he won the International Organ Prize over eight other contestants. When still a mere 18 years old, he became organist at Antwerp Cathedral.

== Relocation to United States ==
Courboin came to the United States in 1904 to serve as organist at St. Paul Roman Catholic Church in Oswego, New York. He was recommended for the position by the great French organ virtuoso Alexandre Guilmant, who played a recital at the church following his 'famous 40' concerts at the St Louis Exposition organ during the 1904 World's Fair. That instrument would later be purchased by Wanamaker and comprise the nucleus of Philadelphia's Wanamaker Organ. It was while serving at St. Paul that Courboin would first meet then Syracuse organ professor Alexander Russell who would later serve as music director for the Wanamaker stores and as Courboin's personal manager.

In 1915 Courboin became organist of the First Baptist Church, Syracuse New York where he played the four-manual Casavant Frères organ, the largest instrument in New York State outside of New York City. This organ was later relocated to Jacoby Symphony Hall, Jacksonville, Florida by the Quimby Organ Company.

Courboin was appointed, in 1918, civic organist for the city of Springfield, Massachusetts, where he performed on a four-manual Steere organ.

Three years later, Courboin left his Syracuse position to assume the role of organist of Hickory Street Presbyterian Church in Scranton, Pennsylvania, where he played a Casavant organ built to his design. The move was made in part to ease Courboin's travels to both New York and Philadelphia for his many concert engagements at the Wanamaker stores.

== Association with Wanamaker ==
Courboin at the 6 manual Wanamaker Organ Console he helped design

Courboin had a major career break in 1919 when he was chosen by Dr. Russell along with Leopold Stokowski and the Philadelphia Orchestra to perform the rededication concert for the newly enlarged Wanamaker Organ. Fifteen thousand people attended this event with an equal number being turned away.

Thereafter Courboin continued to be one of the favorite performers for the Wanamaker organization. During this period he gave several recitals at both the Philadelphia and New York stores, the latter housing a four-manual Austin organ greatly revised and expanded in the early 1920s by the Wanamaker Organ Shop with Courboin's assistance (to 115 stops, 118 ranks and 7,422 pipes).

In 1926 Courboin would be employed by Wanamaker to spearhead the second expansion of the Wanamaker Organ thus maintaining its position as the largest organ in the world. Although he served under a committee chaired by Dr. Russell Courboin's wishes were largely carried out. His stature further rose in the fall of 1926, when Rodman Wanamaker's impatience with setbacks in the progress of the Wanamaker Organ's second enlargement caused him to put Courboin in charge of the whole project. The Wanamaker Organ during Courboin's tenure added the celebrated, vast String Division, the Orchestral Division of Kimball reeds and of flutes, and the Great Chorus subdivision. A planned Stentor division was not built, owing to the 1928 death of Rodman Wanamaker. Typical of this second enlargement was the addition of choirs of like-sounding stops, such as Vox Humanas, French Horns, Dulcianas, Muted Strings, etc. This enabled the ensemble to be built up and brought down seamlessly through addition and subtraction of ranks. During his tenure at Wanamaker's collaboration and friendship with the organbuilder Robert Pier Elliot coincided with Wanamaker patronage of the companies Elliot successively worked for, such as Kimball and Welte.

== St. Patrick's Cathedral ==
Charles M. Courboin in the late 1920s.

In 1928 Courboin was appointed sub-organist at St. Patrick's Cathedral, New York City. In 1943 he was promoted to music director and organist at the cathedral, where he played a 4-manual Kilgen organ which he had been part of the design and was installed under the direction of his predecessor, Pietro Yon.

Although Yon and Courboin were both excellent organists, their approaches to St Patrick's Cathedral were somewhat different. Yon had been an excellent singer whereas Courboin was more of an organist. As a result vocal music was somewhat de-emphasized during the Courboin period and St. Patrick's became thought of as an organist's church.

Nevertheless, in 1948 Courboin formed a 50-voice boy's choir drawing on St. Ann's Academy on nearby Lexington Avenue as a source of talent. The choir had their debut on December 13, 1948, and became very popular, possibly due to their non-religious appearances and those on television. In spite of its popularity the choir was dissolved under Courboin some 20 years later.

During his St. Patrick's years, in the 1930s and 1940s, Courboin was regularly featured on NBC radio. He was on the air when the Japanese attack on Pearl Harbor was announced in 1941. Courboin's service music was nationally televised when he played the funeral service for Robert F. Kennedy in 1968.

He retired in 1968 and was replaced by Edward Rivetti until John Grady was appointed director of music in 1970.

Courboin died on April 13, 1973, in Manhattan, New York City. Cardinal Cook celebrated his funeral mass at St. Patrick's Cathedral, Manhattan. There was no press coverage.

Courboin was buried alongside his wife Mabel in a cemetery plot shared by the family of Firmin Swinnen, a distinguished Belgian-American organist and long time friend. The two families use opposite sides of a common tombstone. A running joke between the two centered on their fondness for a particular brand of cream and their insistence that they be buried with several cases. It's not known if they were able to accomplish this project.

== Teacher ==
Courboin taught at the Peabody Institute in Baltimore where he had several gifted students including Richard Purvis, Virgil Fox, Claribel Thomson and Claire Coci. Frederick Swann also studied the works of Franck with Dr. Courboin.

== Honors ==
In 1921 Leopold Stokowski bestowed upon Courboin the 'Couronne d'honneur' award commissioned by Rodman Wanamaker. King Albert of Belgium bestowed on him the office of the Chevalier of the order of King Leopold II. In 1934 Temple University granted an honorary doctorate. He also received a Papal medal for his performance for Pope Paul VI in 1965. Courboin's doctorate, from Temple University, was honorary.

== Avocations and Additional Associations ==
In addition to his musical credentials, Courboin held a degree in engineering; perhaps for this reason Courboin was throughout his life a great enthusiast of things fast, cars, boats and even airplanes. Courboin was among the first organists if his generation to actually own an automobile and at one time he owned a Stutz Bearcat car equipped with an aircraft engine.

Over the years Courboin was involved in several serious auto accidents, some of which affected his career as an organist. The most serious of these occurred on October 10, 1926, when Courboin was driving home from the Hickory Presbyterian Church. Shortly after midnight as he travelled down a major boulevard he misjudged the direction of a trolley car that made a left turn crossing his path and suddenly found himself unable to stop. The trolley car collided with Courboin's Lincoln tearing off the car's left running board and fender, smashing the windshield and demolishing the top. Courboin suffered severe lacerations to the face, fractured his jaw, lost some teeth and came close to losing his life. He was hospitalized for a full week and was forced to cancel important concert engagements for several months.

Courboin served as tonal director for several prominent American organ building firms for whom he designed several notable instruments. Among these:

- 1932 Kilgen organ (3/52) opus 4828 for St. Justin Church, Hartford CT. Courboin also performed the dedicatory recital.
- 1934 Kilgen organ (3/53) opus 5163 for Our Lady of Refuge Church, Brooklyn, New York. Courboin also performed the dedication concert.
- 1936 Kilgen organ (4/96) opus 5180 for the Shrine of the Little Flower. At the time of the installation Fr. Charles Coughlin was pastor of the shrine.
- 1924 Kimball organ for the Ellis Auditorium of Memphis TN moved in 2002 to Bartlett United Methodist Church by the Milnar Organ Company.
- 1950 Kilgen organ (3/38) opus 7517 for St. Nicholas of Tolentine Church, Bronx, New York

He was also a member of the St. Wilfrid Club, a private organization open to the most notable organists in the New York City area.

== Legacy ==
Courboin was known for his musical memory and most commonly performed without a score. He and his students were exponents of the orchestral style of organ playing displaying an unabashed but not cloying sentimentality. This mastery of musical sentiment was validated when Courboin was chosen to be one of the first organists to be recorded on RCA's premier label, the Red Seal.

Preceded by Pietro Yon	Director of Music and Organist, St Patrick's Cathedral; 1943-1970	Succeeded by John Grady
