= Gesù bambino =

Italian Christmas song composed by Pietro Yon

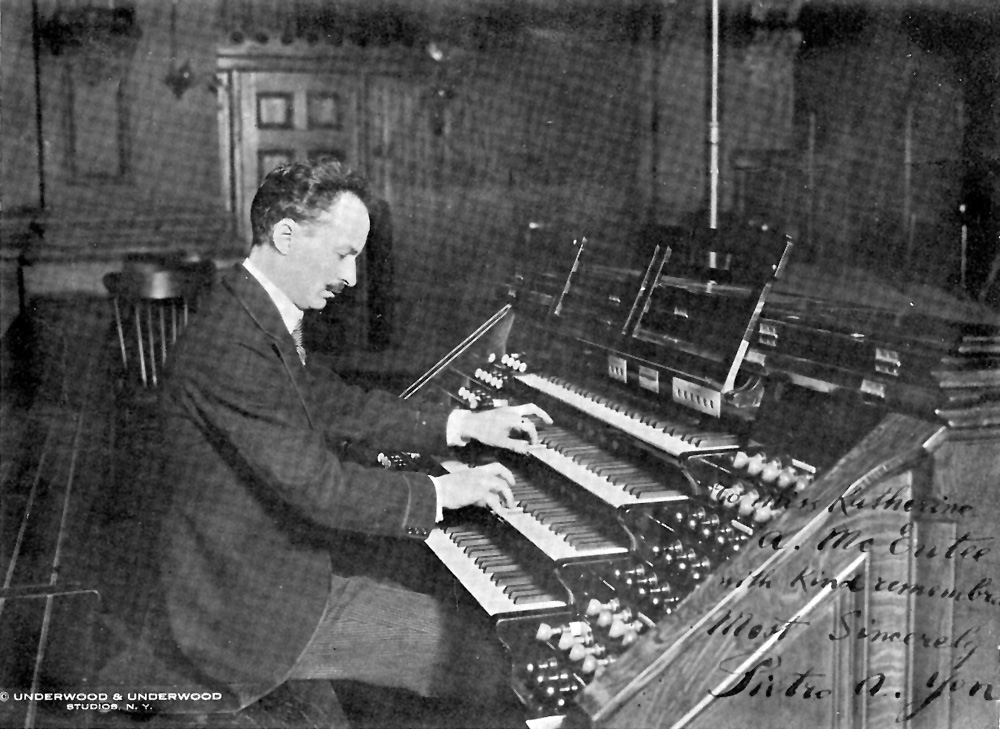
Composer Pietro Yon at a Casavant Frères organ, 1919

"Gesù bambino" ("Baby Jesus") is an Italian Christmas carol composed by Pietro Yon in 1917. The melody was used by Frederick H. Martens in his English language carol "When Blossoms Flowered 'mid the Snows". The melody and lyrics of the chorus are derived from the chorus of "Adeste Fideles" (O Come All Ye Faithful).

The music historian Salvatore Basile notes: "The song would achieve the near-impossible feat of surviving in the standard holiday repertoire, with important performances, innumerable recordings, and every kind of vocal and instrumental arrangement."

== Lyrics ==
Gesù bambino (English)
Performed in English by the male chorus of the U.S. Army Band with piano accompaniment, c. 2010.

Gesù bambino (Italian)
Performed in Italian by a male vocalist accompanied by the U.S. Air Force Band of Mid-America

Nell'umile capanna
nel freddo e povertà
è nato il Santo pargolo
che il mondo adorerà.

Osanna, osanna cantano
con giubilante cor
i tuoi pastori ed angeli
o re di luce e amor.

Venite adoremus
venite adoremus
venite adoremus
Dominum.

O bel bambin non piangere
non piangere, Redentor!
la mamma tua cullandoti
ti bacia, O Salvator.

Osanna, osanna cantano
con giubilante cor
i tuoi pastori ed angeli
o re di luce e amor.

Venite adoremus
venite adoremus
venite adoremus
Dominum.

Ah! venite adoremus
Ah! adoremus Dominum
venite, venite
venite adoremus
adoremus
Dominum.

Martens

When blossoms flowered 'mid the snows
Upon a winter night,
Was born the Child, the Christmas Rose,
The King of Love and Light.

The angels sang, the shepherds sang,
The grateful earth rejoiced;
And at His blessed birth the stars
Their exultation voiced.

O come let us adore Him,
O come let us adore Him,
O come let us adore Him,
Christ the Lord.

Again the heart with rapture glows
To greet the holy night,
That gave the world its Christmas Rose,
Its King of Love and Light.

Let ev'ry voice acclaim His name,
The grateful chorus swell.
From paradise to earth He came
That we with Him might dwell.

O come let us adore Him,
O come let us adore Him,
O come let us adore Him,
Christ the Lord.

Note: This is not a literal translation of the Italian.

Literal

In the humble hut,
In cold and poverty
The Holy infant is born,
Who the world will adore.

Hosanna, hosanna, sing
With a joyous heart,
Your shepherds and angels,
O King of light and love.

Come let us adore,
Come let us adore,
Come let us adore
The Lord.

O beautiful boy do not cry
Do not cry, Redeemer!
Your mother cradles you,
Kisses you, O Savior.

Hosanna, hosanna, sing
With a joyous heart,
Your shepherds and angels,
O King of light and love.

Come let us adore,
Come let us adore,
Come let us adore
The Lord.

Oh! Come let us adore,
Oh! Let us adore the Lord,
Come, come,
Come let us adore,
Let us adore
The Lord.

== See also ==
- List of Christmas carols

== Sources ==
- Martens translation, Wikisource
- Gesu Bambino lyrics and MIDI
