= Pietro Yon =

Italian composer

Pietro A. Yon
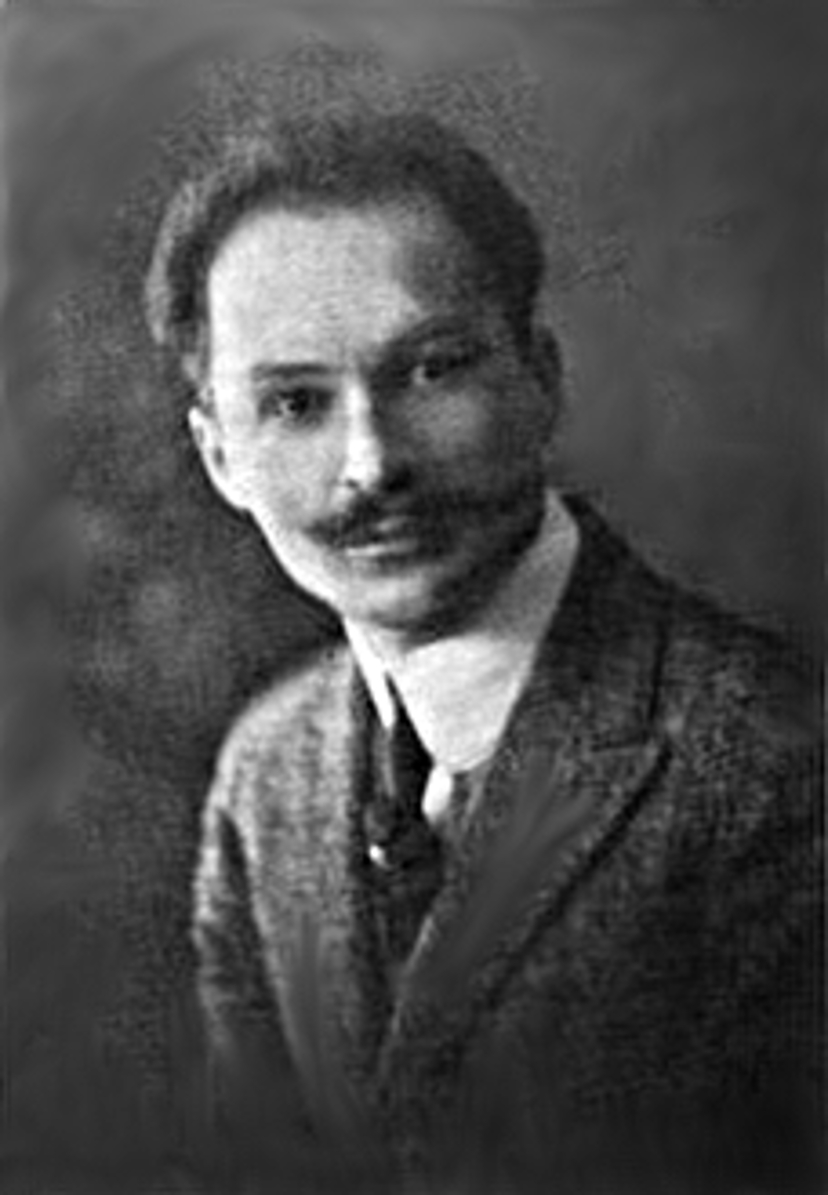
- Pietro Yon, 1918
- Born: August 8, 1886; Settimo Vittone, Kingdom of Italy
- Died: November 22, 1943 (aged 57); Huntington, New York, U.S.
- Known for: organ virtuoso and composer

Gesù bambino
"Gesù bambino" (1917), performed by the chorus of the U.S. Army Band, c. 2010.

Pietro Alessandro Yon (August 8, 1886 – November 22, 1943) was an Italian-born organist and composer who made his career in the United States at several churches including St. Patrick's Cathedral, New York and St. Francis Xavier Church. Prior to emigrating to the United States he performed as an organist for the Vatican's Cappella Giulia in Rome.

== Early life ==
Yon was born in Settimo Vittone, Italy. He was the last son of three of Antonio Yon and Margherita Piazza, his siblings were Stefano Constantino and Lina. His earliest studies in music began at age 6 with Angelo Burbatti, organist at the Cathedral of Ivrea. At the conservatory of Milan he was Polibio Fumagalli's pupil. From 1901-1904 he was enrolled at the conservatory in Turin, studying organ with Remondi and composition with Giovanni Bolzoni. He then attended the Accademia di Santa Cecilia in Rome, studying organ with Remigio Renzi, piano with Bustini and Sgambati, and De Sanctis in composition. In 1905 he graduated with the academy's first-prize medal and won a medal from the minister of public instruction. From 1905 to 1907 he served as assistant organist under his former teacher Renzi at St. Peter's in the Vatican.

== Relocation to America ==
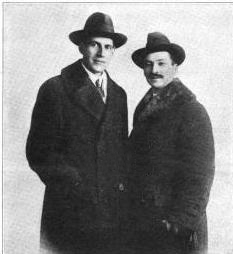
Pietro Yon with Charles M. Courboin

In the spring of 1907, Father John B. Young, pastor of St. Francis Xavier Church in Manhattan, was in Rome on Vatican business and additionally to seek out a replacement for his organist Gaston Dethier, who was leaving to pursue a concert career. Upon hearing Yon play, Father Young was sufficiently impressed to offer him a three-year contract. Thus Yon at age 21 came to the United States, where from 1907 until 1926 he was the organist of St. Francis Xavier Church. He joined his brother S. Constantino Yon, who had preceded him and held a similar position at St. Vincent Ferrer Church.

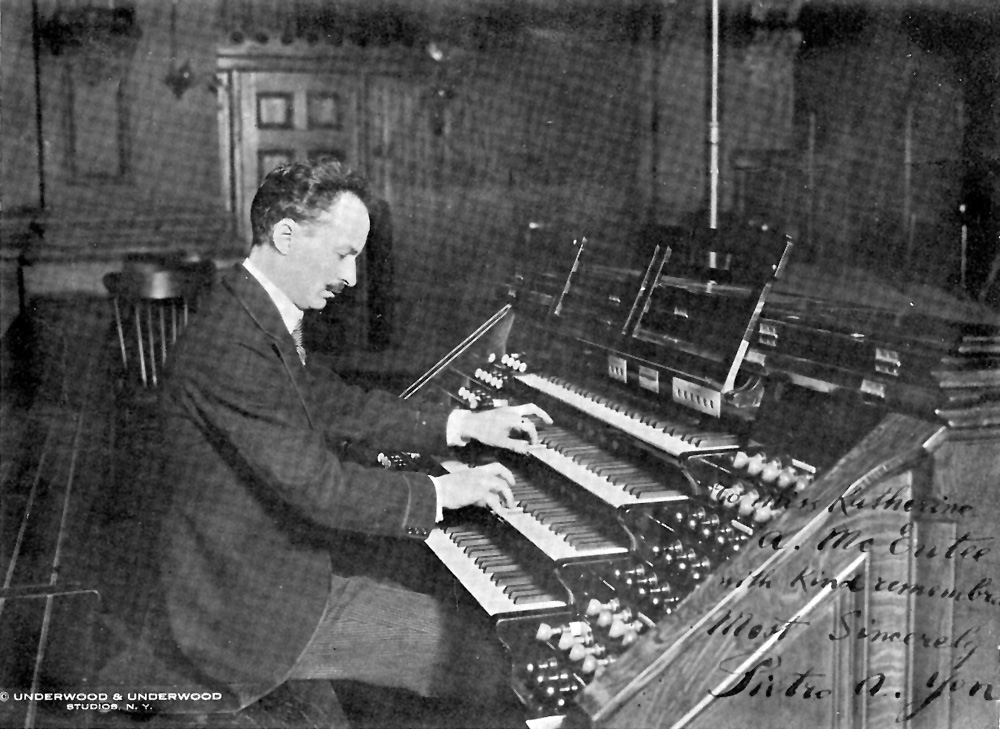
Yon at the organ, 1919

In 1914, Pietro and Constantino Yon opened the Yon Music Studios in Carnegie Hall, a conservatory for aspiring liturgical musicians utilizing a small number of instructors whose work he respected. Pietro would head the organ department while Constantino was in charge of the vocalists.

In 1919, Yon married to Francesca Pesagno. The organist for the occasion was one of Yon's newest friends, the Belgian-American virtuoso Charles M. Courboin, who had been chosen to rededicate the Wanamaker Organ in Philadelphia, now enlarged to 17,000 pipes and still the largest operational organ in the world. In 1920, Yon would share the stage at Wanamaker's with Courboin, Leopold Stokowski, and the Philadelphia Orchestra in one of the gala organ recitals performed at the store through the 1920s.

From 1919 to 1921 Yon was substitute organist at the Vatican's Cappella Giulia. On January 1, 1922 Pope Benedict XV appointed Yon 'Titular Organist' of the Vatican, a singular and unprecedented honor. The appointment put pressure on New York church authorities to promote Yon to a more-prestigious position.

Yon became an American citizen in 1921.

Several years later in 1925, Yon crossed paths in New York City with another aspiring young Italian-American organist and composer, Paul Creston. One of Yon's friends was a parishioner at St. Malachy's Church who was aware of Creston's interest in music and arranged for Yon to meet him. Yon subsequently agreed to provide instructions on the pipe organ to him for a period of about a year and a half. Another student studying under Yon at the time also arranged for Creston to serve as his replacement theatre organist at the New York Coliseum Theater on 181st street. Yon's expert instruction also proved helpful to Creston years later in 1934 when Creston attained a position as the organist at St. Melachny's for over three decades.

== St. Patrick's Cathedral ==
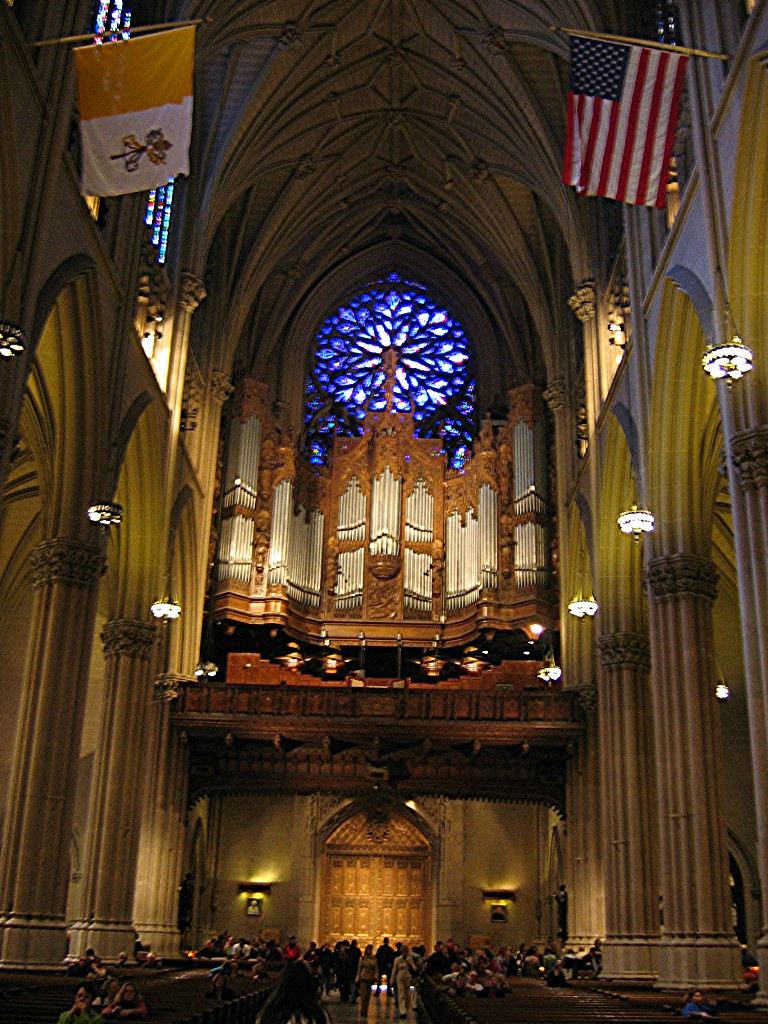
The grand gallery organ at St. Patrick's Cathedral, New York

In 1926, he became the assistant organist of St. Patrick's Cathedral, New York. Shortly after his arrival, church authorities began to discuss the possibility of replacing their existing Jardine and Odell organs, which were installed when the Cathedral was built. The Cathedral's 1929 Jubilee year was near and funding had become available for improvements.

By 1927, it was announced that the Kilgen firm of St. Louis, Missouri had been selected to build the chancel, gallery and echo (triforium) organs, with Courboin as tonal designer. The resulting instrument was then and remains now the magnum opus of the Kilgen firm and one of the finest organs in the world.

Also in 1927 Yon was approached by Carnegie Hall to assist in the replacement of its outmoded Hillgreen, Lane organ with a 4-manual, 59-rank instrument, also by Kilgen with Courboin as tonal director. And a 3-manual Kilgen instrument was to be built for the Yon Music Studios.

Work proceeded rapidly on the Cathedral chancel organ, and by January 1928 the instrument had been installed (still without the elaborate organ case). Associate organist Yon presided over the dedication recital on January 30, 1928. The organ console was relocated to the sanctuary for the performance, which was a major social and musical event attended by 5,000 ticketholders.

On May 1, 1928, Yon was promoted to music director replacing James C. Ungerer, who had been at the Cathedral for 36 years. His wife died in 1929; she was buried in Settimo Vittone, Italy.

In 1933, when the position of Associate Organist at the Cathedral became vacant, Yon chose as a replacement Edward J. Rivetti, one of his own students. Though Rivetti never actually became principal organist he served as assistant under both Yon and successor Courboin until 1970.

In the spring of 1938, both Pietro and Constantino Yon were appointed as Knights of St. Sylvester by Cardinal Patrick Hayes, who would die within a month of the appointment. Pietro also toured the country giving recitals.

== Composer ==
Yon was also a composer, most famous for his Humoresque "L'organo primitivo"- Toccatina for Flute, for organ, and his Christmas piece Gesù bambino. Pietro Yon performed Gesù Bambino (1917) at the famous Carnegie Hall alongside Baritone opera singer Mario Rankel. He also wrote many works for organ, piano, and orchestra, including a Concerto Gregoriano for organ and orchestra (inspired by his experiences with the Wanamaker Organ) (with a companion version for organ and piano), Speranza (Hope) – Solo for Diapason, Concert Study #1 and #2, American Rhapsody and a concerto for oboe. He also composed several masses, like his "Missa Regina Pacis", for three equal voices and organ; and his "Missa Eucharistica" for three unequal voices and organ.

== Teacher ==
Yon's pupils included Cole Porter, Georges-Émile Tanguay, Powell Weaver (Kansas City), Edgar Bowman (Pittsburgh), Robert Elmore (Philadelphia), Paul Creston (New York City), Mary Downey (New York), Henry Seibert (New York), Eugene Phillips (Grand Rapids), Tracy Y. Cannon (Salt Lake City, organist at the Mormon Tabernacle), Helen Knox Ferguson (Dallas), Helen Townsend (Buffalo), Franklin Coates (N.Y.City), Dorothy Mulroney (organist at the Municipal Auditorium Springfield, Mass.), Wilbur Chenowetch (Professor of organ and organist of the Plymouth Church, Lincoln, Neb.), Alan Bucher (Peekskill N.Y.), Edward Rivetti, assistant organist at St. Patrick's Cathedral, N.Y., Radie Britain (Dallas) and Yon's godson Norman Dello Joio.

== Illness and death ==
On April 9, 1943, Yon suffered a massive stroke that paralyzed his entire right side. His sister Lina died of a heart attack upon finding him. As a result, he was unable to fulfill his obligations at St. Patrick's Cathedral and was temporarily replaced by long-time assistant Edward Rivetti.

At first, Yon was sent to Columbia Hospital. Eventually, it was decided to move him to a friend's house in Long Island, where it was thought that he would recover better. In the meantime, the Cathedral held his position open and refused application from organists who wanted to replace him.

In time, it became obvious that Yon would take a long time to recover if at all. Courboin was available as a substitute "for the duration of the illness of Pietro Yon". He was heavily engaged in a recital and teaching career, in addition to consultation on many new organs and performing radio broadcasts on WOR. On October 2, 1943, Courboin was appointed interim organist while Yon was ill.

Yon died in Huntington, New York on November 22, 1943, the feast of St Cecilia. His funeral, which took place on the 25th, was attended by 1,300 including Toscanini. Courboin conducted the choir in Yon's own Mass of Requiem; Yon's setting of O All Ye That Pass by the Way was also sung. He is buried with his sister Lina at the Gate of Heaven Cemetery in Westchester County.

== Notes ==
| Preceded by Jacques C. Ungerer | Organist and Director of Music, St Patrick's Cathedral; 1927-1943 | Succeeded by Charles M. Courboin |
