= Murray M. Harris =

- Born: 1866
- Origin: United States
- Died: 1922 (aged 55–56)
- Occupation: Pipe organs builder

Murray M. Harris (1866–1922) is considered to be the "Father of Organ Building in the American West", and is remembered for building pipe organs of exceptional beauty and quality.

== Background ==
Originally from Illinois, Harris and his family moved to Los Angeles when he was 18. The young Harris went into business as a jeweler and watchmaker. In 1888 he married and shortly thereafter moved back to the East Coast, where he tuned pianos. He eventually apprenticed in organ building with George Hutchings in Boston where he honed his skill at voicing organ pipes, which is one of the most difficult tasks in the organ-building process. In 1894 the 28-year-old Harris was on his way back to Los Angeles to install several organs there for Hutchings but shortly thereafter broke away from Hutchings to open his own organ building company. He began making organs in Los Angeles in 1895. California was an ideal place for the organ factory due to its abundant natural resources. Both metal and wood resources were plentiful and so Los Angeles saw the birth of its first organ factory.

Harris knew that to expand his workforce he would need to adapt to the new electro-pneumatic developments that allowed pipes to be placed at any distance from the console and organs of virtually unlimited size. In September 1900 an insurgent group led by master organbuilder William Boone Fleming was lured from the Votey Organ Co. in Detroit to begin building windchests for Harris using the Fleming electro-pneumatic system. Organ architect George Ashdown Audsley also made design contributions to Harris Organs. Harris looked toward making luxury organs and also made forays into the lucrative residence-organ market headed by the Aeolian Company.

In 1904 Aeolian would begin a series of successful lawsuits against the Harris Co. for patent infringement.

== Harris Organs ==
At the turn of the century Los Angeles, California, with its temperate climate, was experiencing a population boom, in large part due to the discovery of oil. The growing population meant the need for more churches and, in turn, for more organs. By 1899 there were 154 churches in Los Angeles. This meant that there was a large demand for organs there and Harris intended to meet this demand. Consequently, many of the organs produced went to area churches. Two of the most notable organs produced are the 1901 Stanford University Memorial Church and the 1905 Congregation Sherith Israel organs. Both of these organs are still in use and both have been recently restored.

Perhaps Harris's most important historical contribution, however, comes in the building of the organ for the 1904 St. Louis World's Fair which, after the fair, became the core of the famed Wanamaker Grand Court Organ. With around 10,000 pipes, it was, at the time, the world's largest organ. Harris is quoted as saying, "It will be the largest in the world. Positively the largest." The organ was so large (and expensive), in fact, that it wound up causing Harris significant financial trouble. Nonetheless the organ was completed and, at the fair, it brought down the house (literally during one concert where vibrations from the bass pipes in the organ brought down part of Festival Hall's plaster ceiling), winning a gold medal.

Angered by Harris's careless planning, heavy spending and speculative indiscretions, the company ousted him and reorganized as the Los Angeles Art Organ Company under new majority stockholder Eben Smith. Harris re-entered organ building under his own name in 1906. By 1913 Harris's new company experienced financial difficulties and came under the umbrella of the Johnston Piano and Organ Co. For a time Harris became a car salesman. Harris then ran his own brokerage firm in Los Angeles until his death in 1922. He is buried at Forest Lawn Cemetery in Glendale, Cal.
