= Nathan Laube =

American organist

Nathan J. Laube (born 1988) is an American organist. He is currently Associate Professor of Organ at the Eastman School of Music having previously taught there from 2013 to 2020. He was previously on the organ faculty at the State University of Music and Performing Arts Stuttgart, Germany. Laube is also the International Consultant in Organ Studies at the Royal Birmingham Conservatoire in the United Kingdom. He is regarded as "one of the best organists of his generation in the United States".

== Career ==
Laube was born in Chicago and previously served as assistant organist for the Wanamaker Organ. He regularly performs around the world and is "universally acclaimed as one of the most brilliant organists on the concert circuit".

In April 2019, he presented a radio program called "All the Stops" on WFMT, where he demonstrated organs in Germany, France, Slovenia, Croatia and the United States over four 2-hour episodes.

== Personal life ==
Laube is married to Adam Turner.

== Discography ==
- Stephen Paulus: Three Places of Enlightenment / Veil of Tears / Grand Concerto [Nashville Symphony, Guerrero, Laube]. (2014, Naxos: 8559740)
- Die Orgeln der Evangelischen Stadtkirche in Nagold (2014, Ambiente: ACD-1062)
