= Alfred Hollins =

English organist and composer

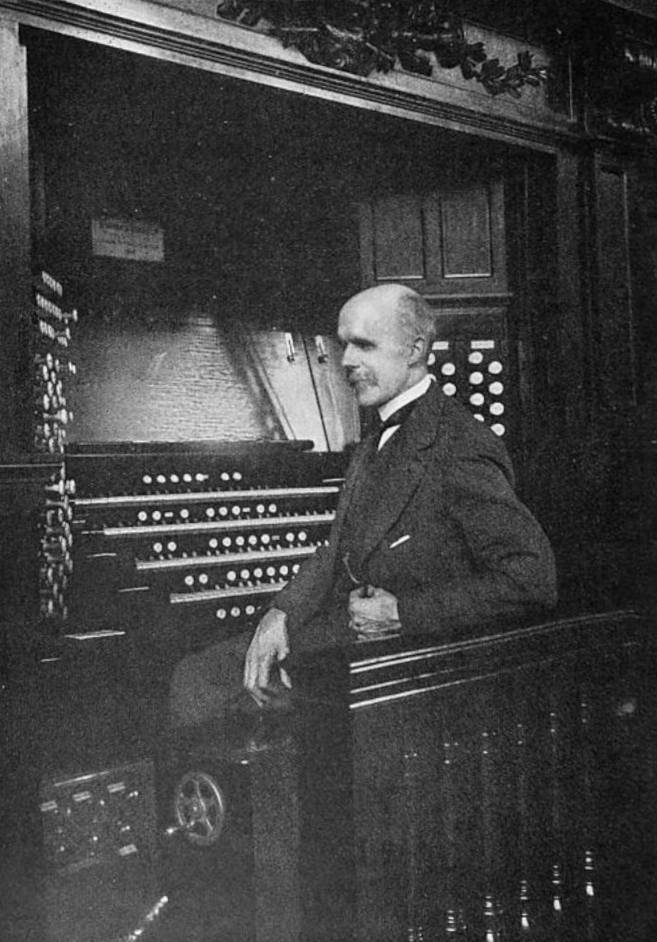
- At Johannesburg Town Hall
- Born: 11 September 1865; Kingston upon Hull, England
- Died: 17 May 1942 (aged 76); Edinburgh, Scotland
- Education: Royal National College for the Blind
- Occupations: Organist, composer, teacher

Alfred Hollins (11 September 1865 – 17 May 1942) was an English organist, composer and teacher, who was noted as a recitalist in Scotland.

== Early life and education ==
Hollins was born in Kingston upon Hull, East Riding of Yorkshire, England, and was blind from birth. His mother died while he was young, and little is known about his father. After his mother's death, Hollins was sent to live with his aunt, who gave him his first piano lesson. Hollins is said to have had perfect pitch. At the Wilberforce Institution for the Blind in York, which he attended from the age of nine, his musical interests were fostered by the head of music there, William Barnby, brother of Joseph Barnby.

In 1878, Hollins enrolled at the Royal National College for the Blind at Upper Norwood where he studied with Frits Hartvigson (piano) and Dr E. J. Hopkins (organ). Hollins then presented several successful concerts, including one at The Crystal Palace, where he performed the Emperor Concerto, and a concert at Windsor in the presence of Queen Victoria.

The opportunity arose for Hollins to study in Berlin under Hans von Bülow. While in Germany Hollins gave a series of concerts – at one time playing three concertos in the one evening – The Liszt E♭, the Schumann A minor and the Emperor. He played before the royal families of Germany and the Low Countries.

== Organist ==
In 1884, Hollins was given his first professional appointment as an organist, at St John's, Redhill. In 1885, Hollins appeared at the Music and Inventions Exhibition in 1885, playing the concert organ. Shortly afterwards another period of study presented itself at the Hoch Conservatory in Frankfurt. In the ensuing eleven years, Hollins was organist at Upper Norwood Presbyterian Church, at the People's Palace (Crystal Palace) and teaching piano and organ at the Royal National College for the Blind.

Soon the Reverend Hugh Black, assistant minister at the Free St George's Church in Edinburgh persuaded the Presbyterian kirk to allow the installation of an organ at St George's. An organ was procured. According to some stories, Black travelled to Nottingham to hear Hollins play, and offered Hollins the position there and then. Hollins accepted the offer and was then committed to St George's for the rest of his life.

In 1923, Hollins played at the inaugural recital of the Caird Hall Organ, Dundee, Scotland, which he had designed. This famous concert organ was the first built by Harrison & Harrison, Durham, England, and has been maintained by them since. It is a Grade 1 Historic Organ (BIOS) and is recognized as one of the finest instruments of its kind in the UK and further afield.

== Concert tours ==
Hollins made multiple concert tours. His first tours of the United States took place in 1886 and 1888, when he played with many leading orchestras. In 1904, Hollins toured New Zealand and Australia. In 1907, 1909 and 1916 he went to South Africa to give a series of concerts at Johannesburg, Port Elizabeth, and Cape Town, giving the opening recital for the organ at the new Town Hall in Cape Town. He had been instrumental in developing the specification for the organ. On 2 and 9 August 1907 he played on the Feather Market Hall organ, Port Elizabeth, which at that time was the largest organ in South Africa. In 1913 he played in Germany, recording for the Welte Philharmonic Organ.

In 1925–26 Hollins gave a major tour of the United States, during which he visited 65 cities. It has been estimated that he traveled some 600,000 miles on his concert tours.

== Composition ==
Hollins composed over 50 organ works and some church music, as well as a small number of secular solo songs, part-songs and piano pieces. There are three substantial Concert Overtures for the organ (1885, 1899 and 1922), showing the influence of Mendelssohn. The published anthems include The Earth is the Lord's and O Worship the Lord. His best known work is A Song of Sunshine, a short organ piece published in 1913. Recordings of his organ compositions have been made by David Liddle and Timothy Byram-Wigfield.

In 1922, Hollins was awarded an honorary doctorate of music from the University of Edinburgh. This was in addition to being made an Honorary Fellow of the Royal College of Organists in 1904.

Hollins was a close friend of another blind organist, William Wolstenholme, and the two often played each others' compositions. In later years, Hollins wrote A Blind Musician Looks Back, his memories as an organist and teacher.

He died in Edinburgh in 1942, aged 76.
