= Adolf Frey (composer) =

American composer (1865–1938)

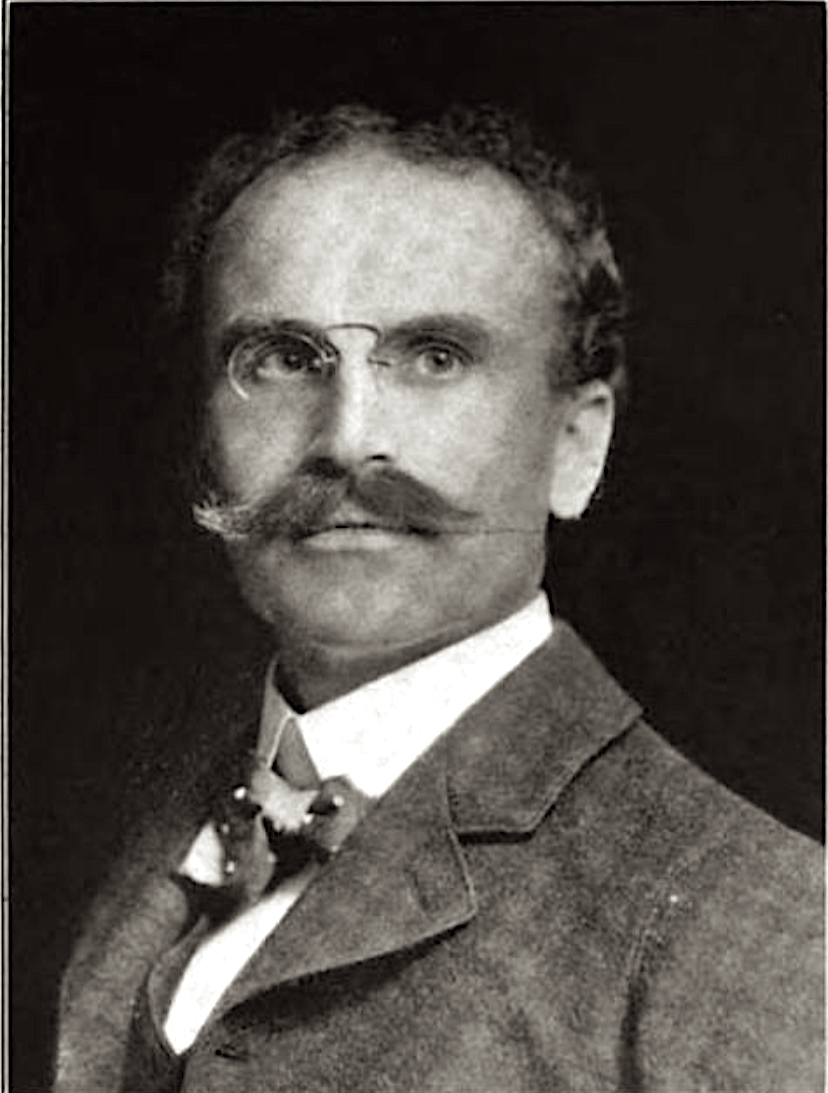
Adolf Frey

Adolf Frey (4 April 1865 – 4 October 1938) was an American composer of German birth. Born in Landau, Kingdom of Bavaria. He was a pupil of Johannes Brahms, Immanuel Faiszt, and Clara Schumann. From 1887 to 1893 he was a musician to Prince Alexander Frederick of Hesse. He then moved to the United States, where he began teaching on the faculty of Syracuse University in the Fall of 1893.
