= Henry Vaughan (architect) =

American architect

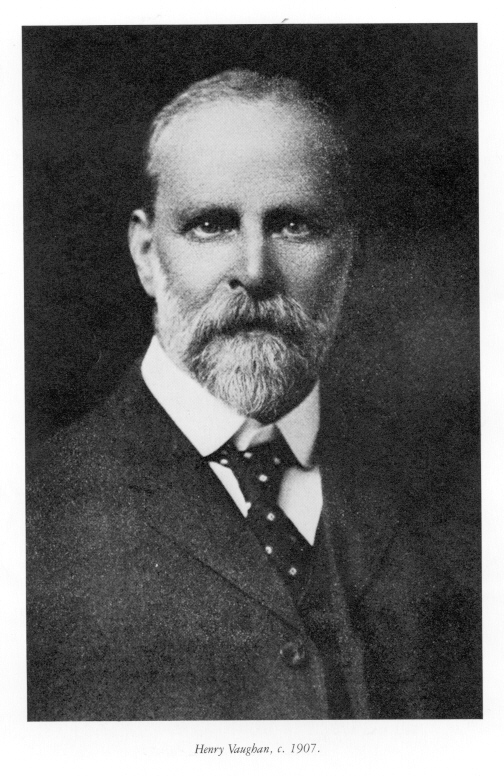
- Born: Henry Vaughan; 1845; Cheshire, England
- Died: June 30, 1917 (aged 71–72); Newton Centre, Massachusetts, US
- Burial place: Washington National Cathedral
- Occupation: Architect
- Known for: Church architecture in the English Gothic style

Henry Vaughan (1845 – June 30, 1917) was a prolific and talented church architect who emigrated to America from England to bring the English Gothic style to the American branch of the Anglican Communion (the Episcopal Church). He was an apprentice under George Frederick Bodley and went on to great success popularizing the Gothic Revival style.

== Life ==
Vaughan was born in Cheshire, England. When he was a child, his family relocated to Dollar, Clackmannanshire, Scotland. He attended Dollar Academy, and was awarded a bronze medal in art from the school in 1863. He then began his apprenticeship under George Frederick Bodley, eventually becoming head draftsman at the firm of Bodley and Garner.

In 1881, Vaughan came to America traveling on the Atlantic Clipper a packet owned by the Glidden & Williams Shipping Company, whose founder William T. Glidden lived in Newcastle, Maine. Vaughan knew Glidden and lived at his home on Glidden Street in Newcastle in 1881. He designed and built St. Andrew's Church in 1883, on Glidden Street in Newcastle which was dedicated on 22 November 1883. Later Vaughn moved to Boston and opened an office in Pemberton Square.

He rapidly found success with the Anglican (Episcopal) and Catholic churches. His first commission in the U.S. was the Chapel of the Society of Saint Margaret. In the mid-1880s, Vaughan began to receive commissions from Edward Francis Searles, working on numerous projects continuing through until Vaughan's death.

Vaughan never married.

Vaughan died in 1917 in the Boston suburb of Newton Centre, and was interred at the Washington National Cathedral.

== Projects ==
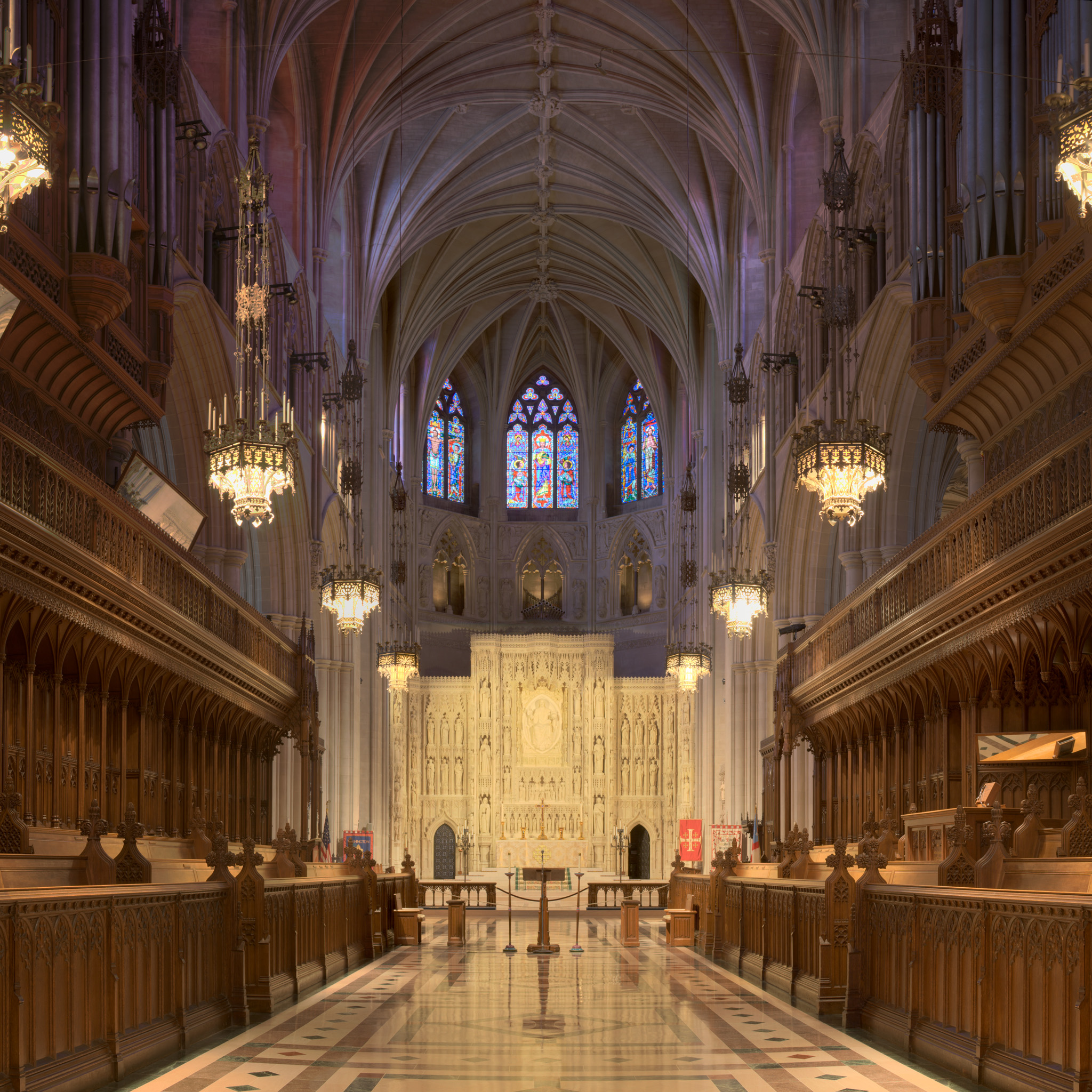
Washington National Cathedral, Washington, DC

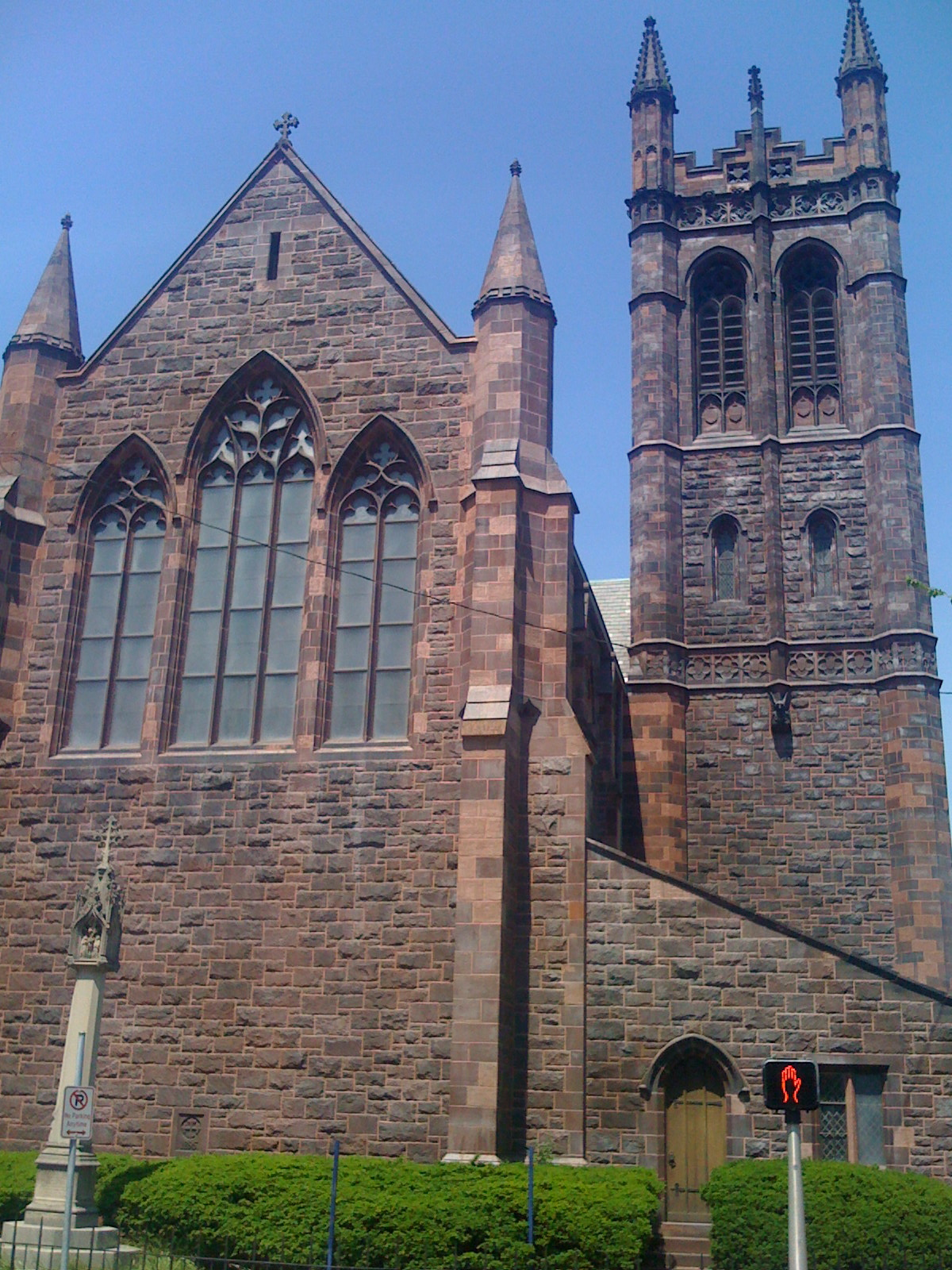
Christ Church, New Haven, CT

Notable Vaughan projects include:

- Chapel of the Society of Saint Margaret, Boston, MA (1881–2)
- St. Mary's Episcopal Church, Dorchester, MA (1888)
- portions of the Cathedral of Saint John the Divine, New York, particularly the chapels to Saint Boniface (1916), Saint James (1916), and Saint Ansgar (1918)
- Washington National Cathedral, Washington, D.C. (with Bodley, later work by Philip Frohman)
- The Episcopal Church of the Mediator in Kingsbridge, NY, called "the little cathedral of the Bronx" (this structure is in need of significant restoration due to water damage from leaks in the original roof; its major interior art pieces and Tiffany windows are protected and in good condition) (1913)
- Christ Church, New Haven, CT (1895–8)
- Holy Cross Monastery, West Park, NY (with Ralph Adams Cram, 1902–4)
- St. John's Chapel, at Groton School, Groton, MA (1899–1900)
- Chapel of St. Peter and St. Paul, at St. Paul's School, Concord, NH (1886–8, 1894)
- The Thistles, a private home in Dublin, NH
- Amasa Stone Chapel, at Case Western Reserve University, Cleveland, OH (1911)
- Church of the Redeemer Chestnut Hill, MA (1913–5, 1920)
- Church of the Holy Innocents (Hoboken, New Jersey) (1885)
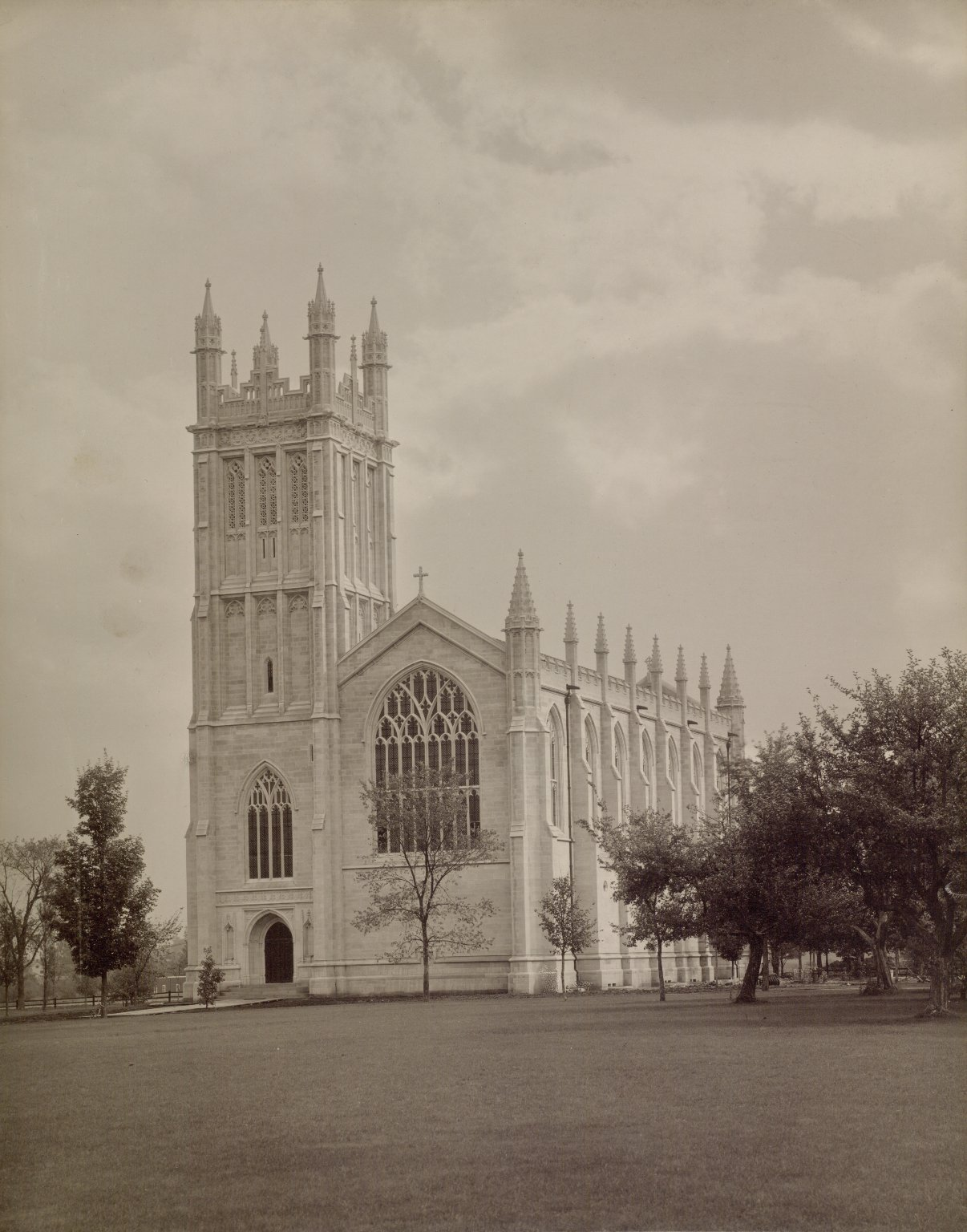
St. John's Chapel, Groton School

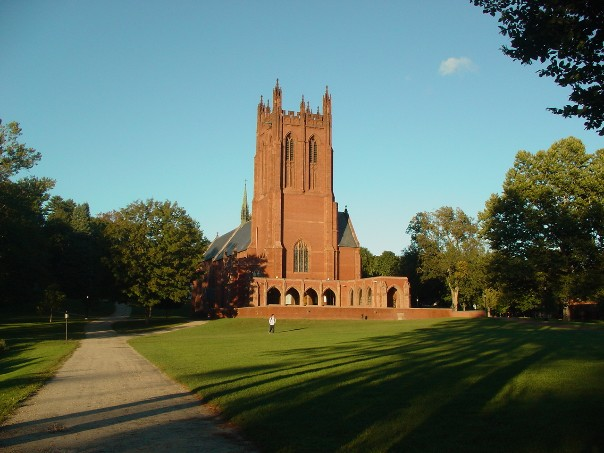
Chapel, St. Paul's School, Concord, NH

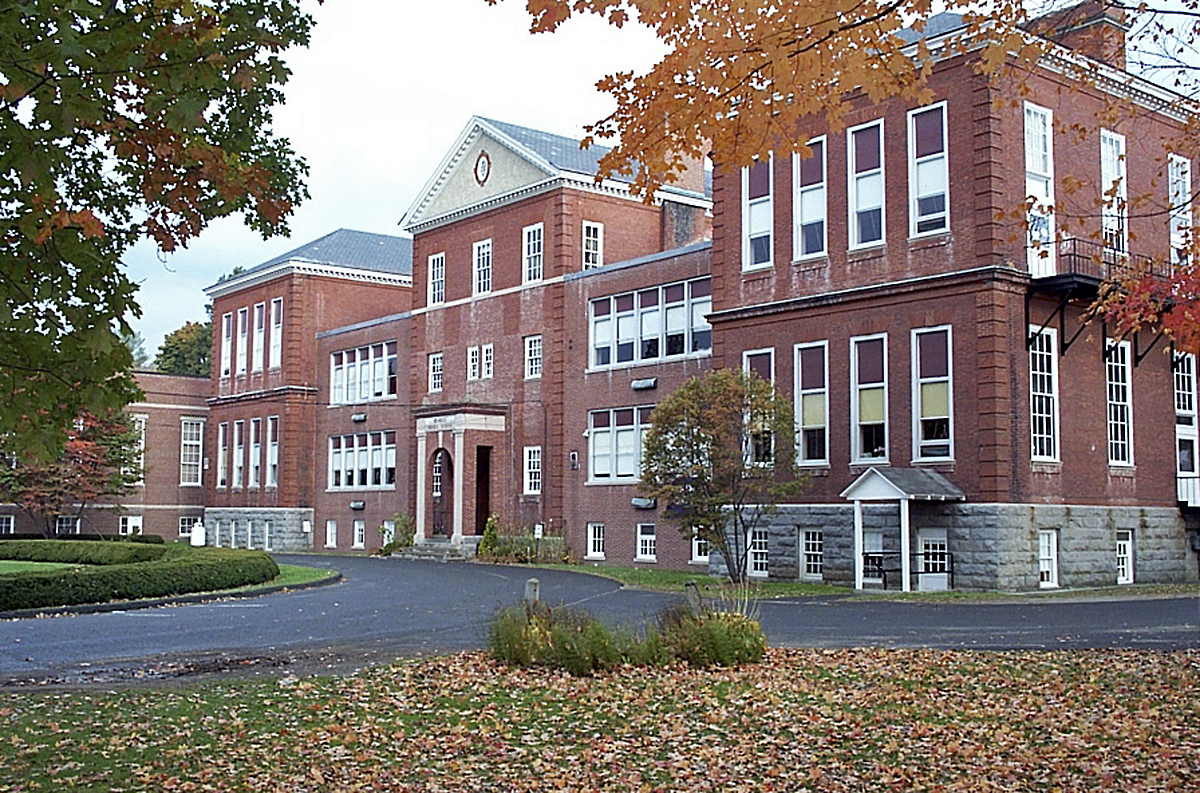
Searles High School (1898) closed, Great Barrington, MA

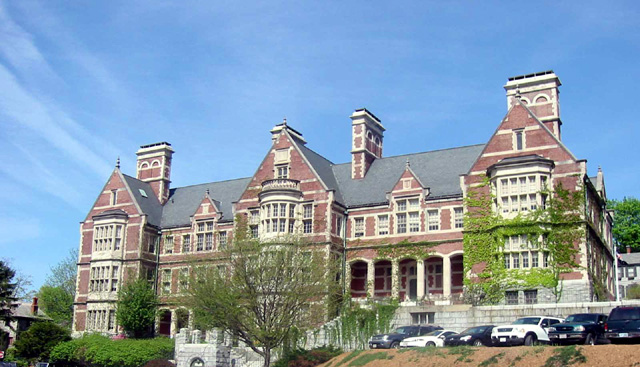
Searles High School (1904), now City Hall for Methuen, MA

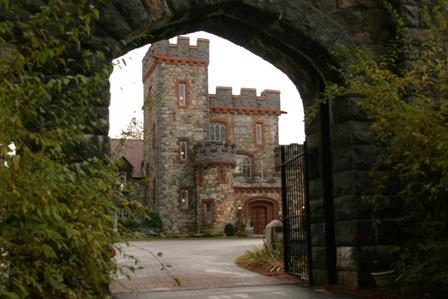
Searles Castle (1905–1915), Windham, NH

=== Collaborations with Edward Francis Searles ===
- Searles High School, (1898) Great Barrington MA
- Searles High School (1904), Methuen, MA
- Serlo Organ Hall (completed 1909, now known as Methuen Memorial Music Hall) and Pine Lodge Mansion in Methuen, MA
- Stillwater Manor, a 24-room 3-story mansion in Salem, NH
- Stanton Harcourt Castle, now known as Searles Castle, Windham, NH. 20-room castle completed in 1915 at a cost of approximately $1,250,000, modeled on the Stanton Harcourt Castle in Oxfordshire, England.
- Dream House, now known as Searles Mansion, Block Island, RI. Constructed 1886–1888 as a home for Searles and his wife, it had a "twin house" design with each of the Searles' having a separate identical side of the mansion.
- Mary Francis Searles Science Building, Bowdoin College, Brunswick, ME
- various schools and churches

== Sources ==
- Morgan, William (1983). The Almighty Wall: The architecture of Henry Vaughan. New York, NY: The Architectural History Foundation / MIT Press.
