= Searles High School =

- U.S. National Register of Historic Places
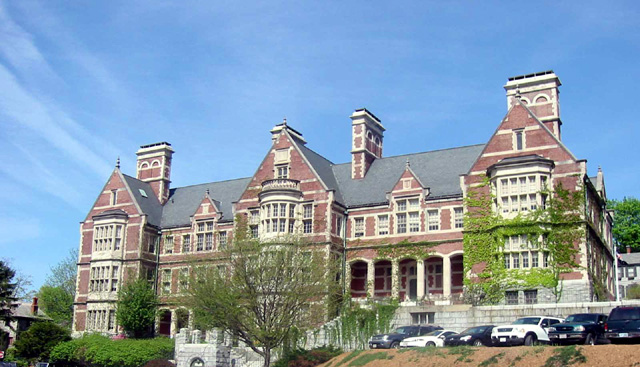

- Location within Massachusetts Location within the United States
- Location: Methuen, Massachusetts
- Coordinates: 42°43′48″N 71°11′2″W
- Built: 1904
- Architect: Henry Vaughan
- Architectural style: Colonial
- MPS: Methuen MRA
- NRHP reference No.: 84002431
- Added to NRHP: January 20, 1984

Searles High School, now Methuen City Hall, is a historic former school building at 41 Pleasant Street in Methuen, Massachusetts, and an excellent example of English Renaissance Revival architecture. It was designed by Henry Vaughan, a favorite of wealthy industrialist Edward Searles, who funded construction of the building in 1904. Searles was a major presence in the town, also funding construction of the Vaughan-designed Methuen Memorial Music Hall. In the atrium rests an early small demonstration version of the Emancipation Memorial, which Searles purchased from its designer, Thomas Ball. The building was added to the National Register of Historic Places in 1984. It now houses offices of the City of Methuen.

== Description and history ==
The building is set on the southeast side of Pleasant Street, east of Methuen's central business district and facing the former Searles estate to the south. It is a large 3-1/2 story brick and stone building, surrounded by a stone retaining wall. The building has three front-facing gable sections, which are joined by cross-gabled sections. Each of the three sections has a central projecting multi-story bay, that in the center section rounded and topped by a balustraded. The two joining sections have arcaded lower levels and windows with quoined surrounds above. Four brick chimney towers rise above the building, with stone quoining and false arches on the long sides.

The school was built in 1904 as one of many gifts to the town by local son Edward Searles. It served as the community's high school until 1957, and then as an elementary school until 1975. It then housed school administration offices until 1983, when it was sold to a private developer for conversion to offices. The town repurchased the building in 1992, and it now houses municipal offices.

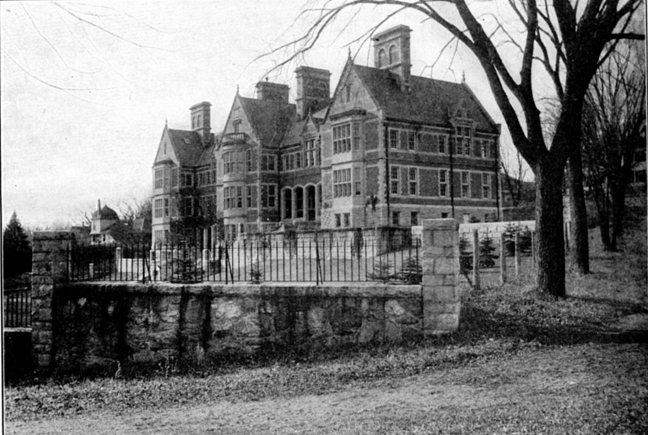
Searles High School circa 1909

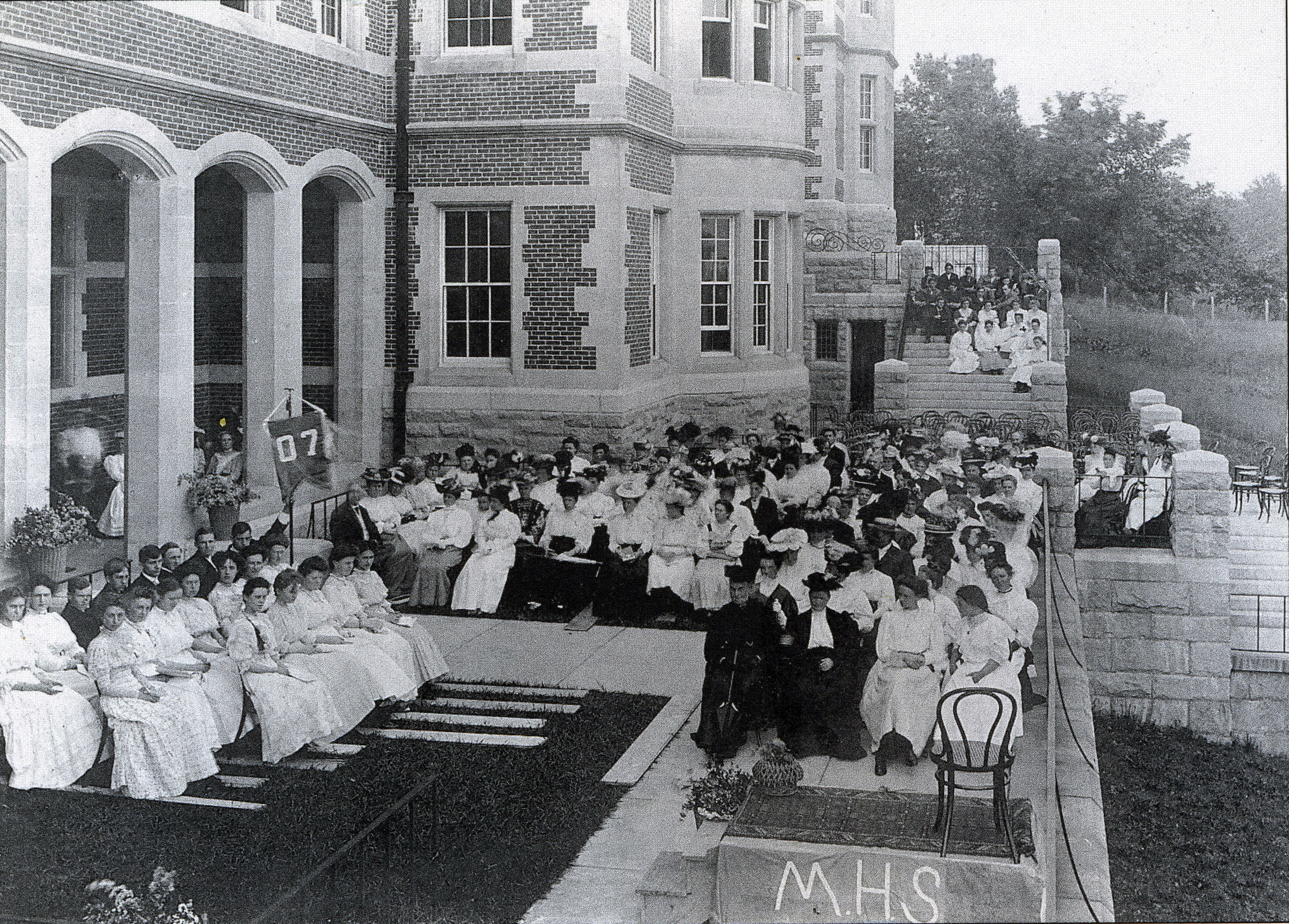
Searles High School Class of 1907

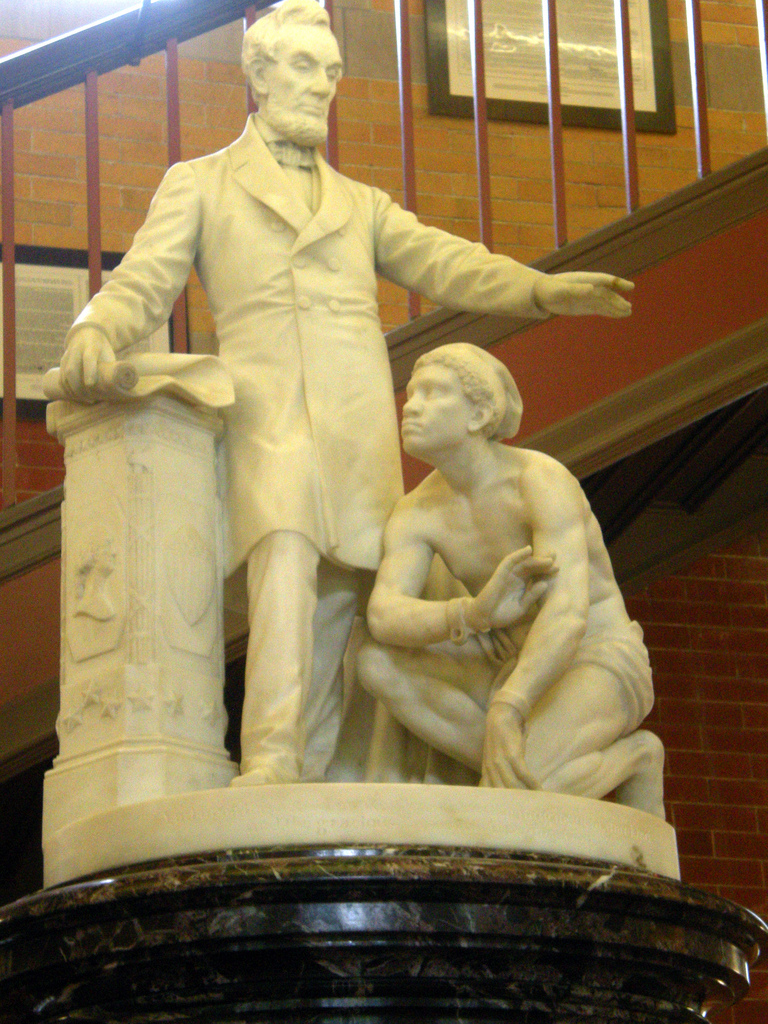
This smaller version of the Emancipation Memorial rests in the Methuen City Hall atrium.

== Notable alumni ==
Notable alumni of the school include Andrew Haldane (1917–1944), a United States Marine Corps officer killed in action during the Mariana and Palau Islands campaign of World War II.

== See also ==
- National Register of Historic Places listings in Methuen, Massachusetts
- National Register of Historic Places listings in Essex County, Massachusetts
