= Orpheum Theatre (Boston) =

Music venue in Boston, Massachusetts

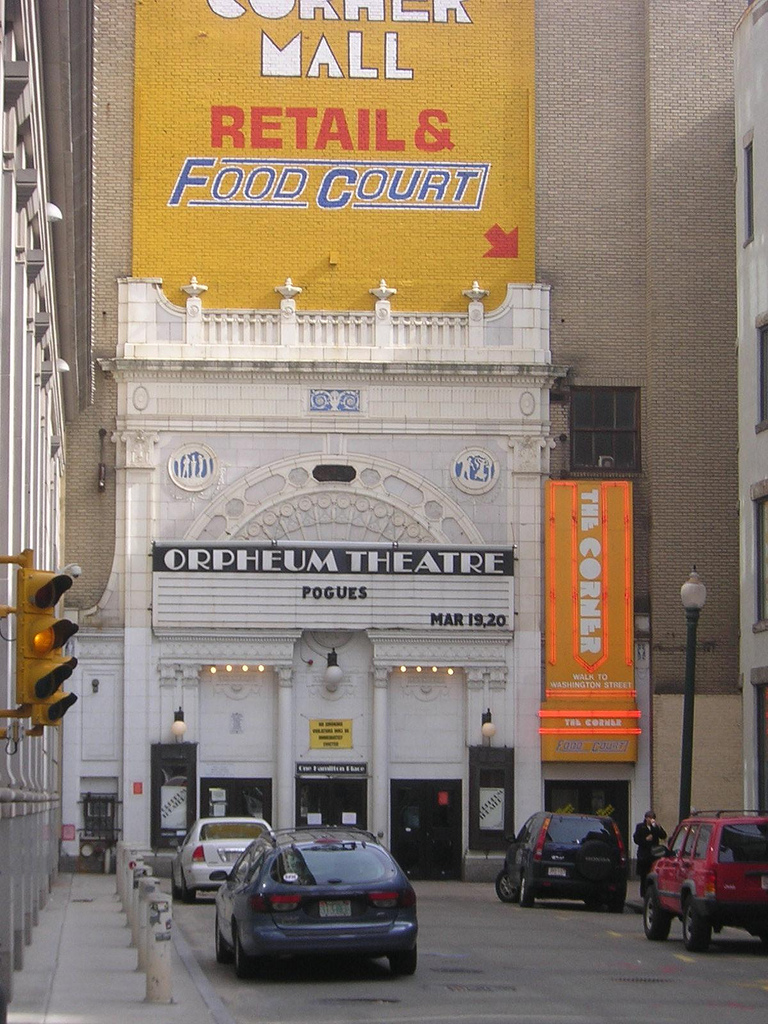
- The venue in 2008
- Interactive map of Orpheum Theatre
- Former names: Boston Music Hall (original); Empire Theatre (early 1900s); Aquarius (1970s)
- Address: 1 Hamilton Place; Boston, Massachusetts
- Coordinates: 42°21′22.4″N 71°3′39″W
- Owner: The Druker Company, Ltd.
- Operator: Crossroads Presents
- Capacity: 2,700
- Type: Music venue
- Public transit: Park Street station (MBTA)

Construction
- Opened: 1852; 174 years ago
- Renovated: 1915, 1971, 2009
- Architect: Thomas W. Lamb (1915)

Website
- www.orpheumtheatreboston.com

The Orpheum Theatre is a music venue located at 1 Hamilton Place in Boston, Massachusetts. One of the oldest theaters in the United States as designed by Snell and Gregerson, it was built in 1852 and was originally known as the Boston Music Hall. It was the founding location of the New England Conservatory of Music in 1867 and it was the original home of the Boston Symphony Orchestra from its founding in 1880. The concert hall was converted for use as a vaudeville theater in 1900. It was renamed the Orpheum Theatre in 1906. In 1915, the Orpheum was acquired by Loew's Theatres and substantially rebuilt. It operates as a mixed-use hall, primarily for live music concerts.

The theater has no connection with a different venue in Boston that operated as the Music Hall during 1962–1980, now known as the Wang Theatre.

== History ==
When the Boston Symphony moved to Symphony Hall in 1900, the Boston Music Hall closed. It was converted in 1900 to a design by Little and Browne, for use as a vaudeville theater and operated under a number of different names, including the Music Hall and the Empire Theatre. The original organ, built in Germany, was removed in that renovation and rehoused in the purpose-built Methuen Memorial Music Hall by 1909. In 1906, the venue was renamed the Orpheum Theatre. In 1915, the theater was acquired by the Loew's Theatres. Loew's reopened the Orpheum in 1916 with a completely new interior designed by architect Thomas W. Lamb.

Operated by Loew's, the theater was at first a combination vaudeville and movie theater and later a straight first-run movie house. The Orpheum closed as a movie theatre on January 31, 1971. African-American business owner and activist Arthur Scott of Boston's Dorchester neighborhood obtained a 10-year lease on the venue and became its general manager. Scott undertook a $125,000 ($993,735 in 2025) refurbishment, pledging to "present only top-flight entertainers". It reopened as the Aquarius, a live concert hall, on May 27, 1971, with James Brown headlining. The Aquarius name was used through at least January 1974, when the venue hosted a simulcast of Muhammad Ali vs. Joe Frazier II.

From June 1971 to June 1978, the theater served as the home of the Opera Company of Boston, under director Sarah Caldwell, until that company moved to the current Boston Opera House. It was the site of several significant American premiers including: Berlioz Les Troyens (1972), Verdi Don Carlos in the original five-act French version (1973), Prokofiev War and Peace (1975), Berlioz Benvenuto Cellini (1975), Sessions Montezuma (1976), Glinka Ruslan and Ludmila (1977), and the first major American production of Verdi Stiffelio (1978). During that period, America's most popular diva, Beverly Sills, made annual appearances, performing: Norma, La Traviata, Daughter of the Regiment, Barber of Seville, I Capuletti ed i Montecchi, Rigoletto, and Don Pasquale.

The first half of The Police's 1995 double album Live! was recorded at the Orpheum on November 27, 1979. U2's performance at the theater in 1983 was recorded and broadcast on the King Biscuit Flower Hour. In 1984, the original lineup of Aerosmith re-formed with a performance at the Orpheum. Tin Machine recorded a portion of their live album, entitled Tin Machine Live: Oy Vey, Baby, at the theater on November 20, 1991. Portions of the March 3–4, 1992, shows at the Orpheum by the Allman Brothers were used on their 1992 live CD An Evening with the Allman Brothers Band: First Set and the cover photo was taken in front of the venue's marquee.

Currently, the theater is owned by The Druker Company, Ltd. The contract to operate the Orpheum was acquired by Don Law, a Boston concert promoter, from the Live Nation entertainment company, in 2009. Law announced a major renovation for the theater, after which it reopened in late 2009. Live Nation retains a stake in the operations of Law's company, Crossroads Presents.

In 2019, Citizens Bank announced a 10-year agreement with Crossroads Presents including "presenting partnership deals" for several venues, resulting in the theater being branded as the "Orpheum Theatre presented by Citizens".

The entrance to the theater, since at least 1976, is the former alley entrance on Hamilton Place, replacing the original entrance on Washington Street, which was converted into retail space.

== Image gallery ==
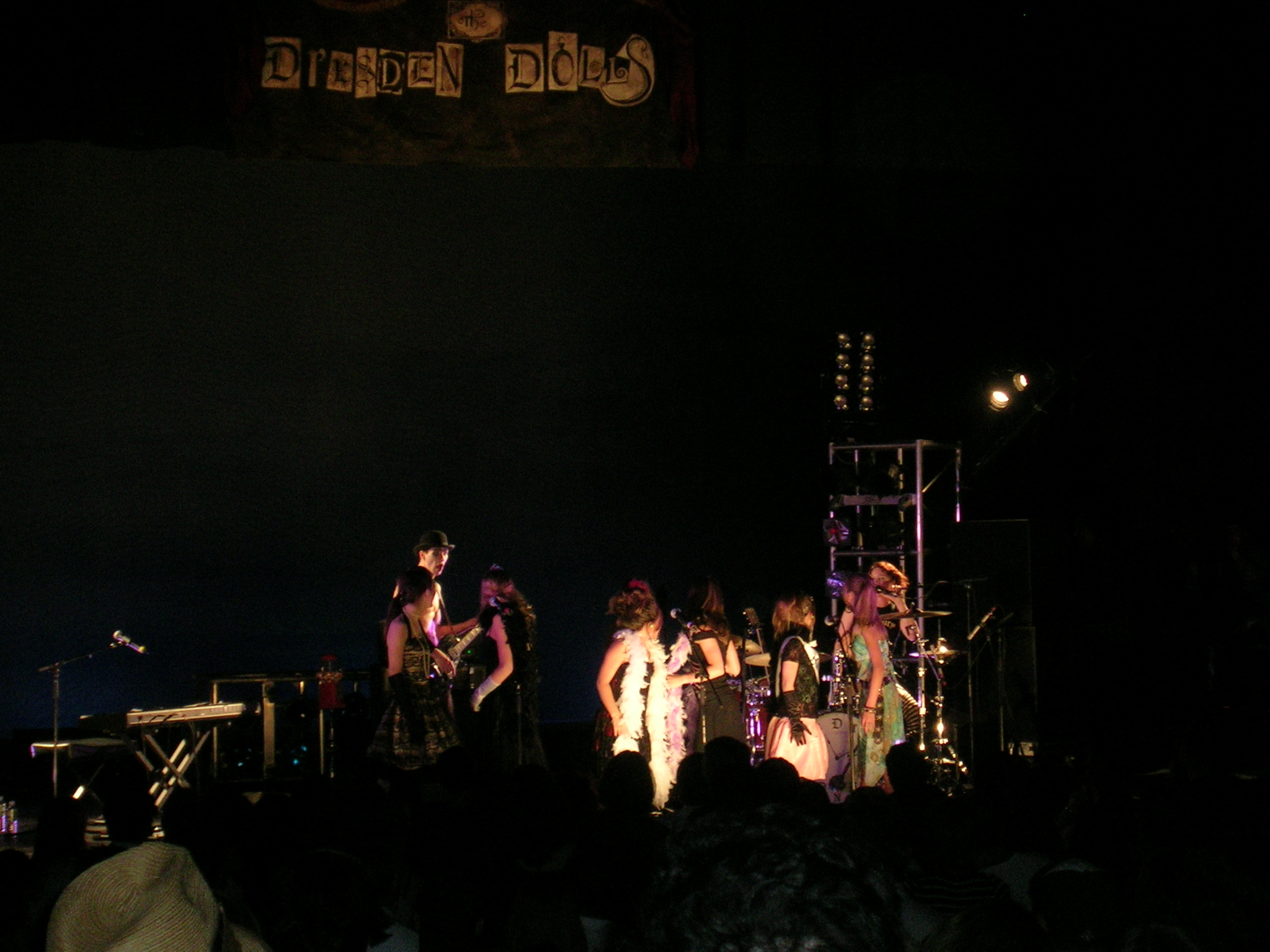
The Dresden Dolls, 2006

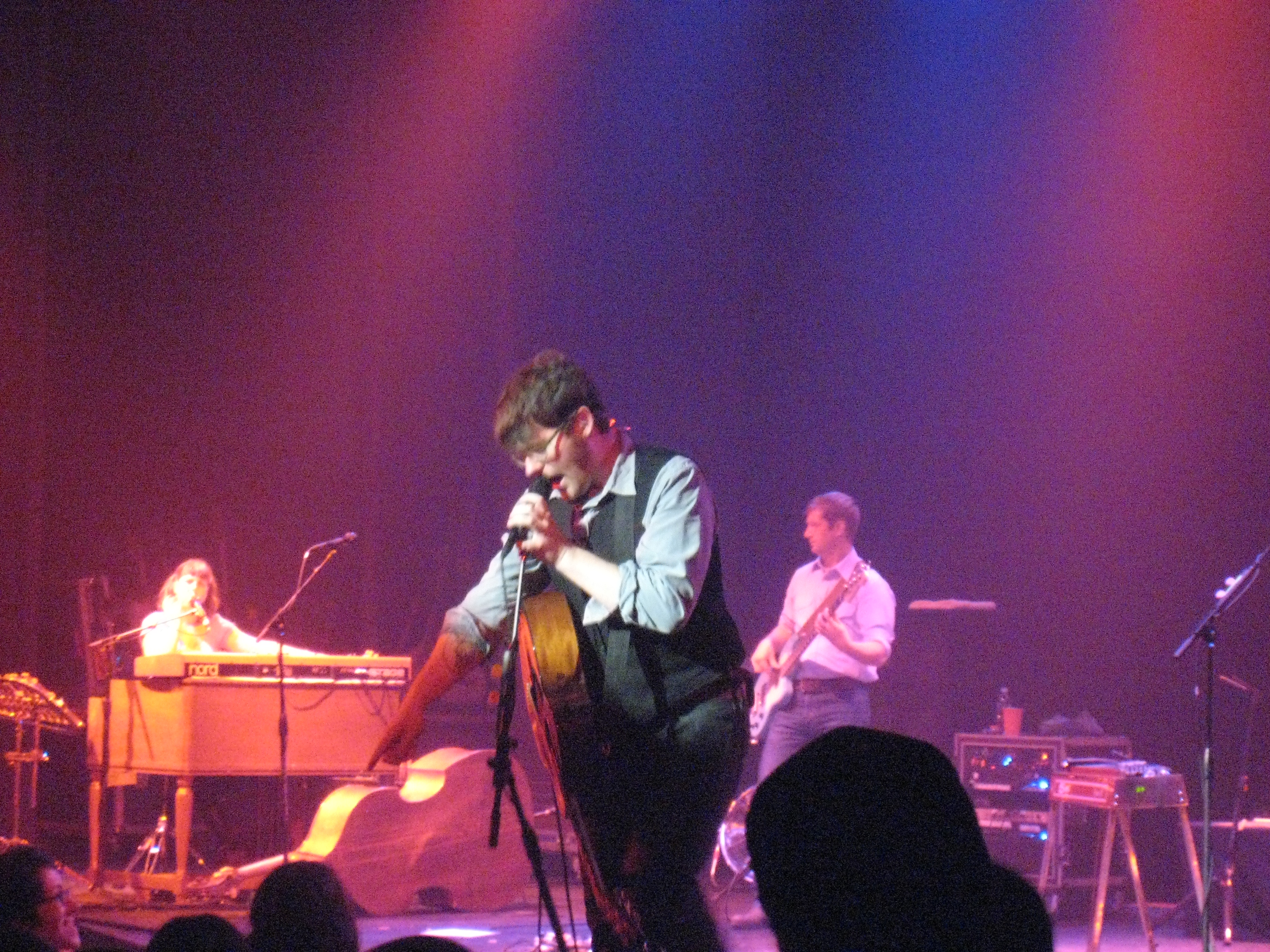
The Decemberists, 2008

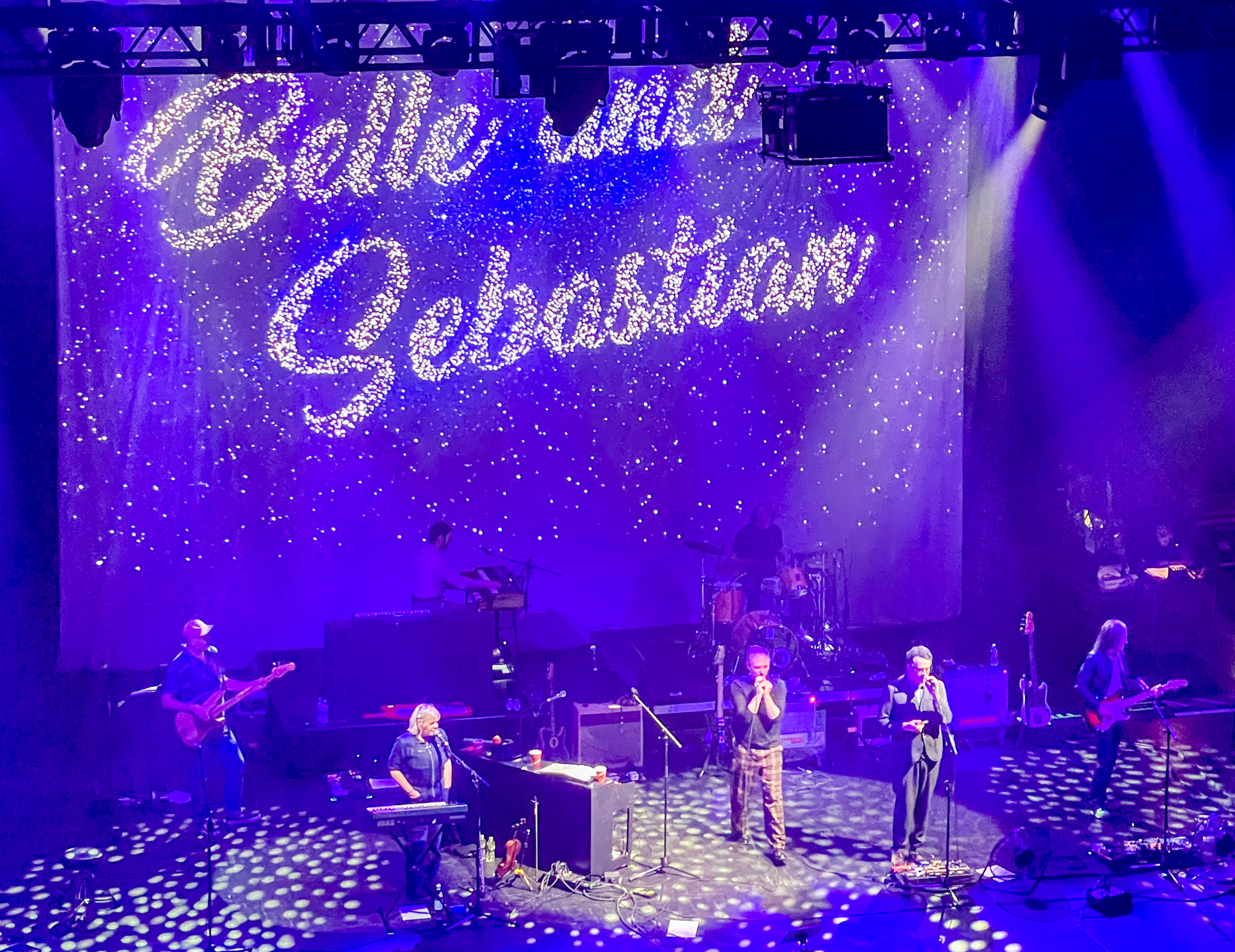
Belle and Sebastian, 2024

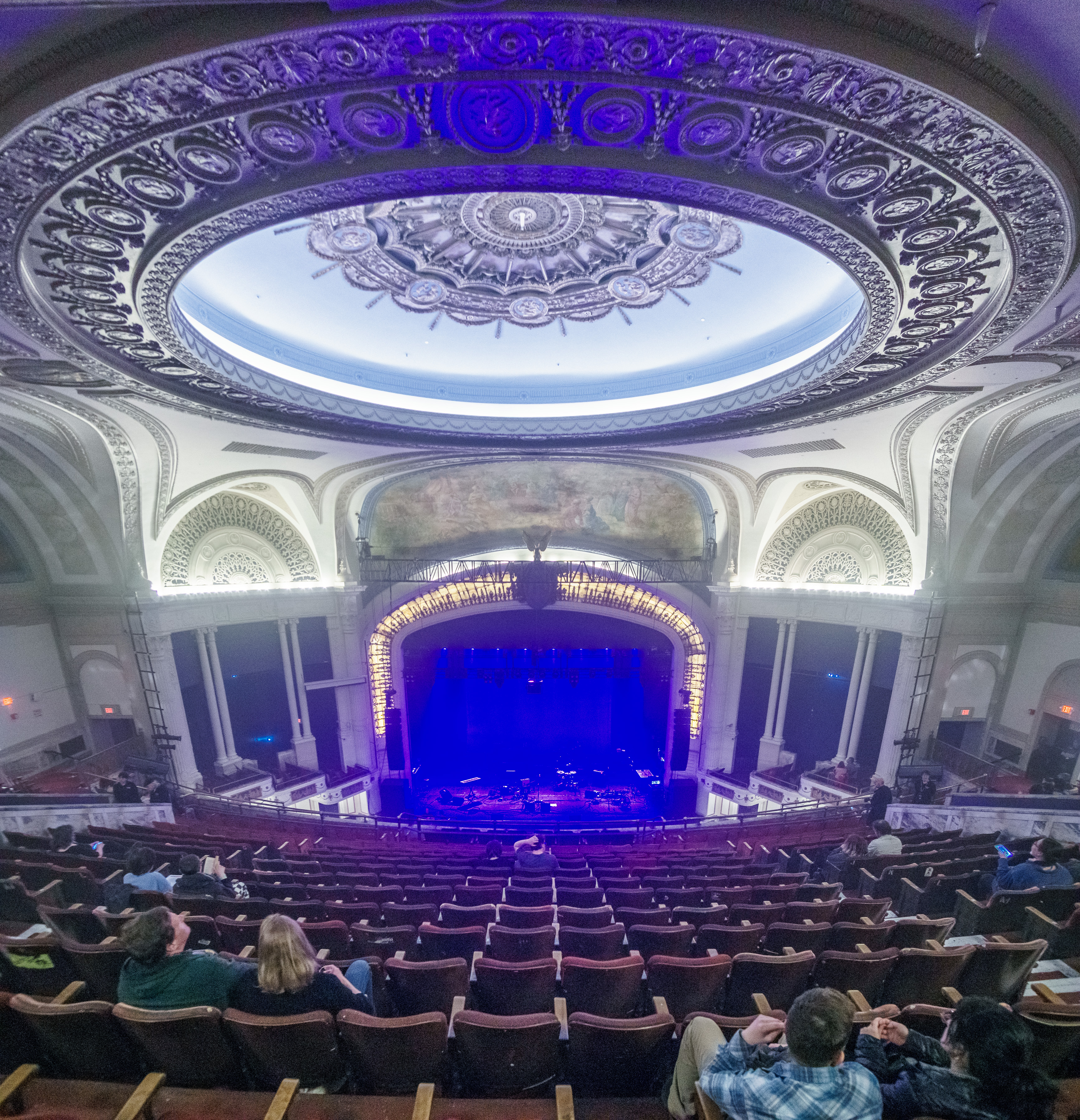
Interior, 2024

== See also ==
- House of Blues
