= Holy Trinity Cathedral, Liepāja =

Church building in Liepāja, Latvia

Liepāja Holy Trinity Cathedral
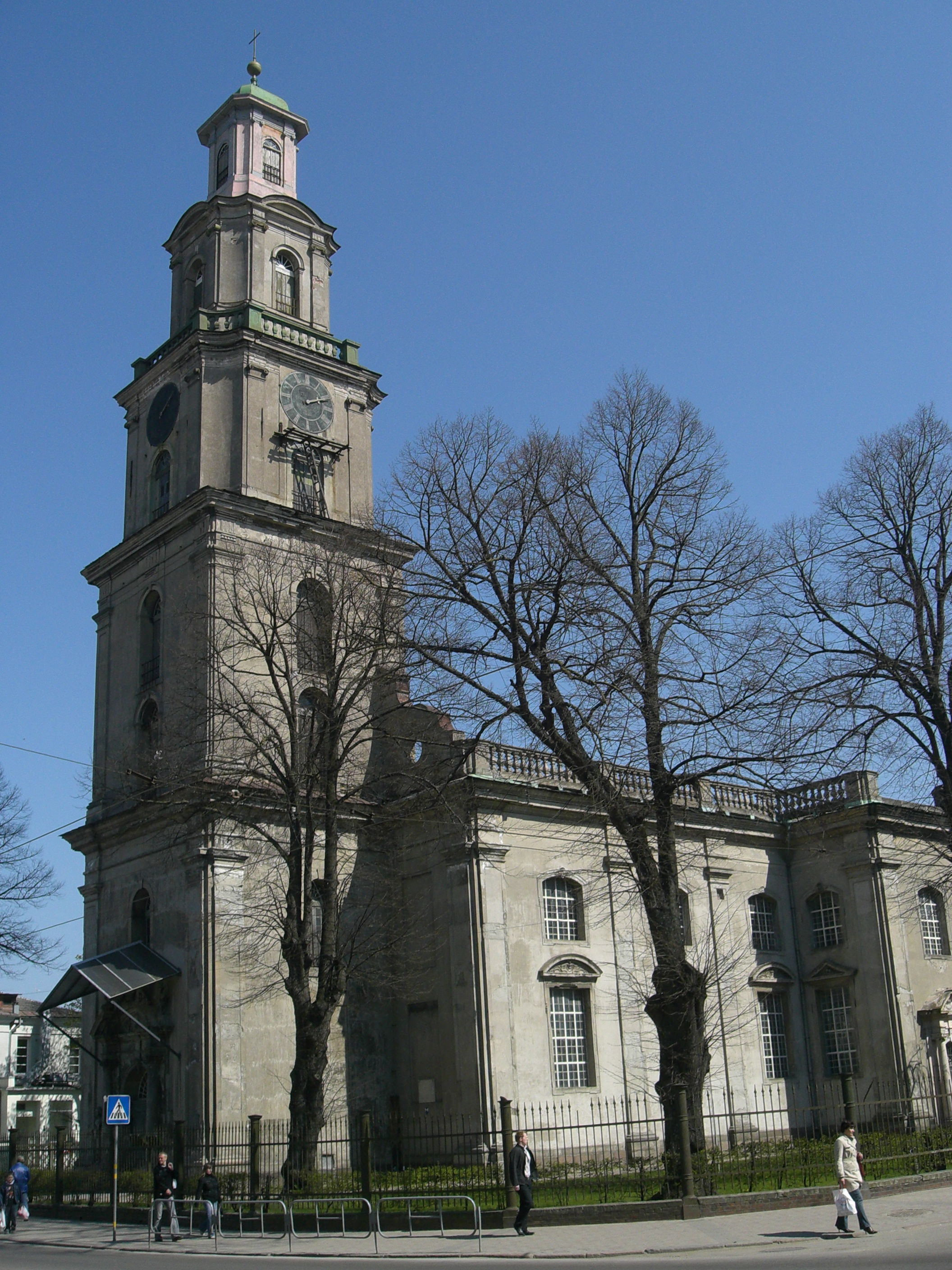

- Location within Latvia
- 56°30′36″N 21°00′48″E
- Location: Liepāja
- Country: Latvia
- Denomination: Lutheran

Architecture
- Style: Baroque
- Years built: 1742-1758, 1865-1866

Administration
- Diocese: Liepāja

Liepāja Holy Trinity Lutheran Cathedral (Latvian: Liepājas Svētās Trīsvienības katedrāle) is a historical Lutheran cathedral in Liepāja, Latvia. It is the seat of the Bishop of Liepāja, and principal church of the Diocese of Liepāja.

== History ==
In 1742, the city council decided to build a church for the German community and commissioned the Königsberg architect Johann Christoph Dorn, who brought two designs to Libau. The community of Libau opted for the more elaborate of the two plans, despite the high costs, striving to surpass the Trinity Church in Mitau (now Jelgava), the other large city in Courland. Mitau was the capital of the Duchy of Courland and Semigallia and was dominated by the conservative nobility. Libau, on the other hand, was a thriving commercial city. Its church, to be built in a modern style, was intended not least to express the self-confidence of Libau's German bourgeoisie. The church was solemnly consecrated on December 5, 1758.

The church interior and exterior architecture is built in the late Baroque style with classic features. The cathedral interior is characterized by its Rococo features and luxurious furnishings with wood carvings and gold plating. The altar is 13 metres high and the cathedral is particularly notable for its organ with 131 stops, 4 manuals and over 7000 pipes, making it the largest mechanical organ in the world until 1968. It was the first large mechanical pipe organ in Latvia and was built by Henrich Andreas Contius in 1779.

In 1865–1866, the building underwent its first major reconstruction – the original draft tower was raised on the two upper floors to almost 55 metres high. In 1906, the church installed a clock mechanism. Several changes were also made to the sacristy behind the altar; a new one was added.

== Diocese of Liepāja ==
The cathedral houses the cathedra (seat) of the Bishop of Liepāja, who leads one of the three dioceses of the Evangelical Lutheran Church of Latvia. The current bishop is Hanss Martins Jensons, born 11 July 1968, who was ordained in the Lutheran Church in 2003, and was consecrated and enthroned as Bishop of Liepāja on 6 August 2016. Services in German are held once a month.

== Community use ==
The cathedral is also a major venue for concerts and exhibitions in the city and regularly hosts classical music concerts and art displays. Tours of the cathedral are available and the 55-metre (180 ft) tower offers scenic views of the city of Liepāja.

== See also ==
- Dome Cathedral Pipe Organ
