= St. Andrew's Church (Newcastle, Maine) =

Historic church in Maine, United States

- U.S. National Register of Historic Places
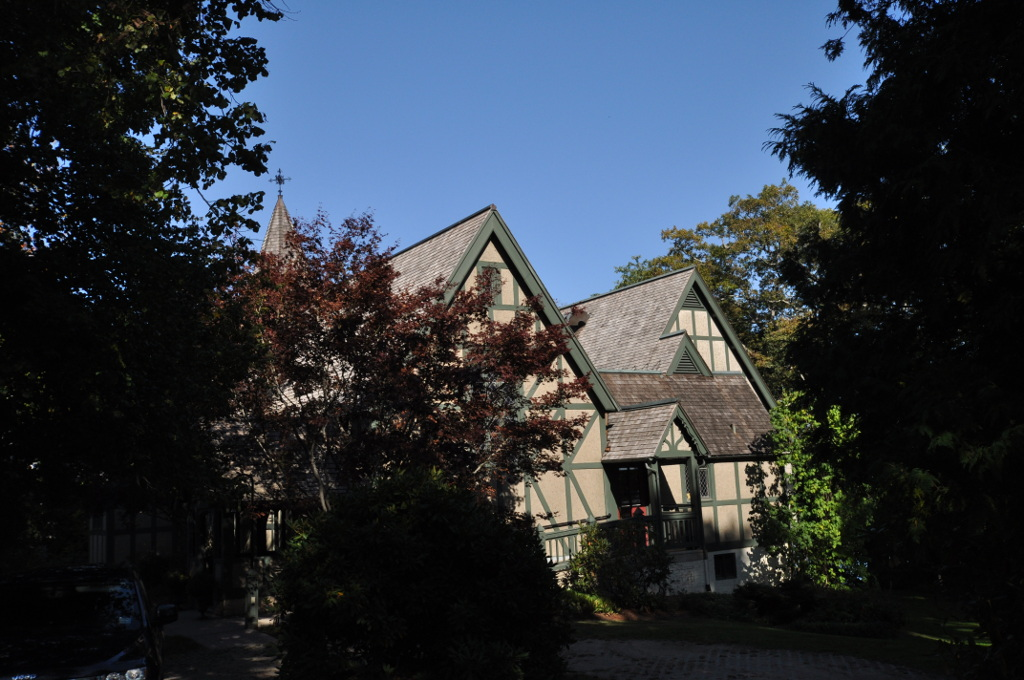

- Location within Maine Location within the United States
- Location: 11 Glidden St., Newcastle, Maine
- Coordinates: 44°2′3″N 69°32′4″W
- Area: 1 acre (0.40 ha)
- Built: 1883; 143 years ago
- Architect: Vaughan, Henry
- Architectural style: Gothic, cottage Gothic
- NRHP reference No.: 76000101
- Added to NRHP: October 08, 1976

St. Andrew's Church is a historic Episcopal church at 11 Glidden Street in Newcastle, Maine. Built in 1883, it was the first example of cottage Gothic Revival church in the country, and the first US design of English architect Henry Vaughan, a major proponent of the style. It was listed on the National Register of Historic Places in 1976.

== Description and history ==
St. Andrew's stands in the Newcastle's main village, on the east side of Glidden Street, just north of United States Route 1 and west of the Damariscotta River. It is a single-story wood frame structure, with a gabled roof and a brick foundation. The walls are finished in half-timbered stucco, and the roof is covered by wooden shingles. A single-stage tower rises near the back end, topped by a pyramidal roof with flared edges. Projecting from the main rectangle in line with the tower are shed-roof extensions of the main roof. The main entrance is set at one end of a long side wall, sheltered by a gabled portico.

The church was designed by Henry Vaughan and built in 1883. Vaughan had come to the United States in 1881, and this was his first of many ecclesiastical works completed after his arrival. Vaughan went on to become a leading proponent of the Gothic Revival in the United States, contributing to the design of the Washington National Cathedral and other landmarks. This church was built on land donated by the Glidden family, and was built by William Glidden. When Newcastle's downtown was devastated by fire in 1908, the church parish house was used to temporarily house the Newcastle National Bank.

== See also ==
- National Register of Historic Places listings in Lincoln County, Maine
