= St. Mary's Episcopal Church (Dorchester, Massachusetts) =

Historic church in Massachusetts, United States

- U.S. National Register of Historic Places
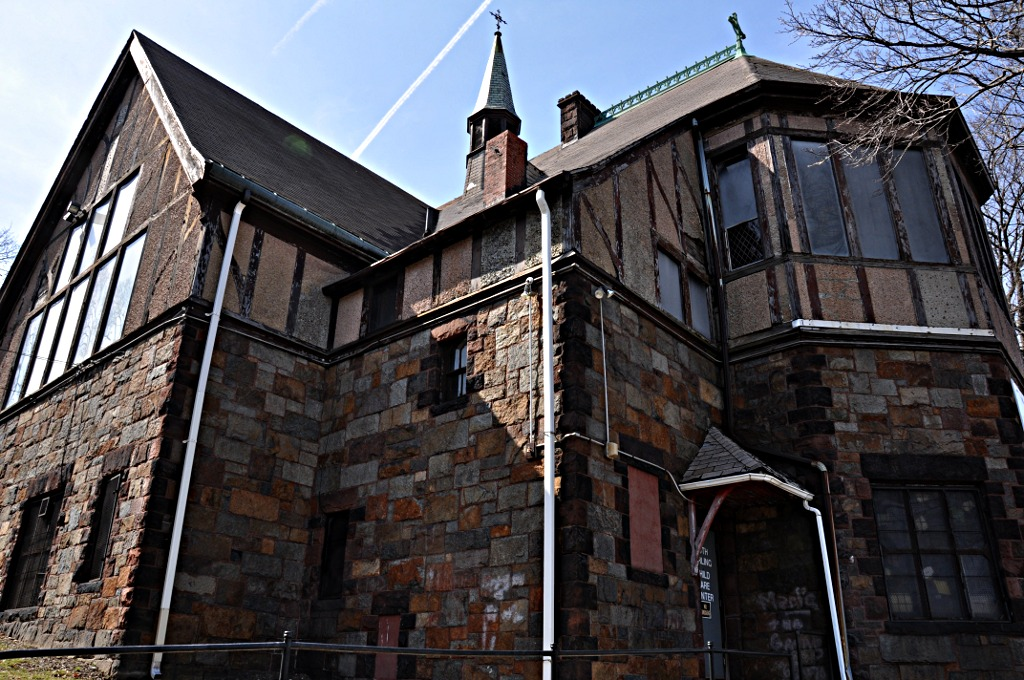
- 2010 view of St. Mary's, showing the 1893 extension

- Location within Massachusetts Location within the United States
- Location: 14–16 Cushing Ave., Boston, Massachusetts
- Coordinates: 42°18′59″N 71°3′54″W
- Area: less than one acre
- Built: 1888; 1893; 1907
- Built by: Woodbury & Leighton (1888)
- Architect: Henry Vaughan (1888); Hartwell & Richardson (1893); Charles K. Cummings (1907)
- Architectural style: Tudor Revival
- NRHP reference No.: 98001292
- Added to NRHP: October 30, 1998

St. Mary's Episcopal Church is a parish of the Episcopal Church (United States), noted for its historic church at 14–16 Cushing Avenue in the Dorchester neighborhood of Boston, Massachusetts. Founded in 1847, it remains an active congregation of the Episcopal Diocese of Massachusetts.

The first church building, on Bowdoin Street, burned down in 1887, prompting the formation of St. Mark's Church and the building of the current structure. Designed by the English architect Henry Vaughan, the Tudor Revival church building was built in 1888. In 1893 it was expanded in a matching style with the addition of transepts and the chancel by architects Hartwell & Richardson. The parish house was designed by Charles K. Cummings and built in 1907. The church contains a high-quality collection of stained glass windows, including the work of Tiffany Studios and Charles Jay Connick.

The property was listed on the National Register of Historic Places in 1998. One of the oldest food pantries in the area is located in the church.

== See also ==
- National Register of Historic Places listings in southern Boston, Massachusetts
