= William W. Warren =

American politician (1834–1880)

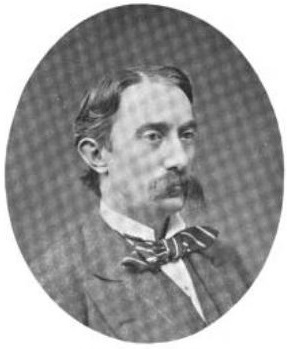

Member of the U.S. House of Representatives from 's 8th district
- In office March 4, 1875 – March 3, 1877
- Preceded by: John M. S. Williams
- Succeeded by: William Claflin

Member of the Massachusetts State Senate
- In office 1870

Personal details
- Born: William Wirt Warren; February 27, 1834 Brighton, Boston, Massachusetts
- Died: May 2, 1880 (aged 46) Boston, Massachusetts
- Resting place: Evergreen Cemetery
- Party: Democratic
- Education: Harvard University
- Occupation: Lawyer; politician

William Wirt Warren (February 27, 1834 – May 2, 1880) was an American lawyer and politician who served one term as a U.S. representative from Massachusetts from 1875 to 1877.

== Early life and education ==
William W. Warren was born in Brighton (now a part of Boston), Massachusetts on February 27, 1834. He received a classical education, and graduated from Harvard University in 1855.

He attended Harvard Law School, continued to studied law, was admitted to the bar, and commenced practice in 1857.

== Career ==
In 1865 he was appointed assessor of internal revenue for the seventh district of Massachusetts, responsible to ensure payment of taxes levied to support the Union Army during the American Civil War. Warren also served on Brighton's school board and as its town clerk. He advocated for Brighton to be annexed to Boston, which occurred in 1874.

=== Political career ===
Warren was a delegate to the 1868 Democratic National Convention. In 1870 he served in the Massachusetts State Senate. He ran unsuccessfully for Congress in 1872, losing to John M. S. Williams.

In 1874 Warren was elected as a Democrat to the Forty-fourth Congress (March 4, 1875 – March 3, 1877). He was an unsuccessful candidate for reelection in 1876 to the Forty-fifth Congress, losing to William Claflin.

=== Return to private practice ===
After leaving Congress Warren resumed practicing law Boston.

== Death ==
Warren died in Boston on May 2, 1880. He was interred at Evergreen Cemetery in Boston.

== See also ==
- 1870 Massachusetts legislature

U.S. House of Representatives
Preceded by John M. S. Williams	Member of the U.S. House of Representatives from Massachusetts's 8th congressional district 1875–1877	Succeeded by William Claflin
