= Boston Music Hall =

Original home of the Boston Symphony Orchestra

Coordinates: 42°21′22.4″N 71°3′39″W

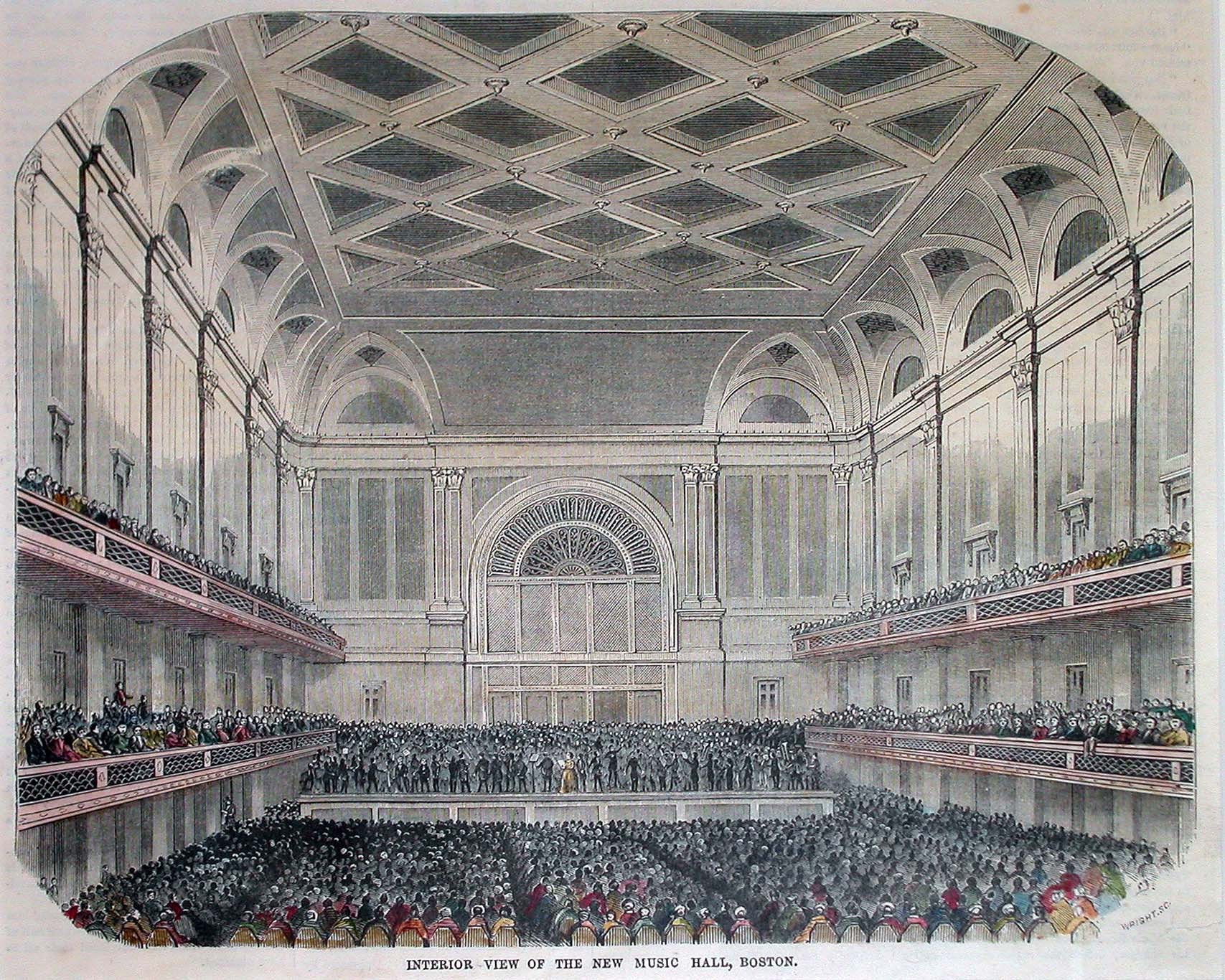
The Boston Music Hall, Winter Street, 1852

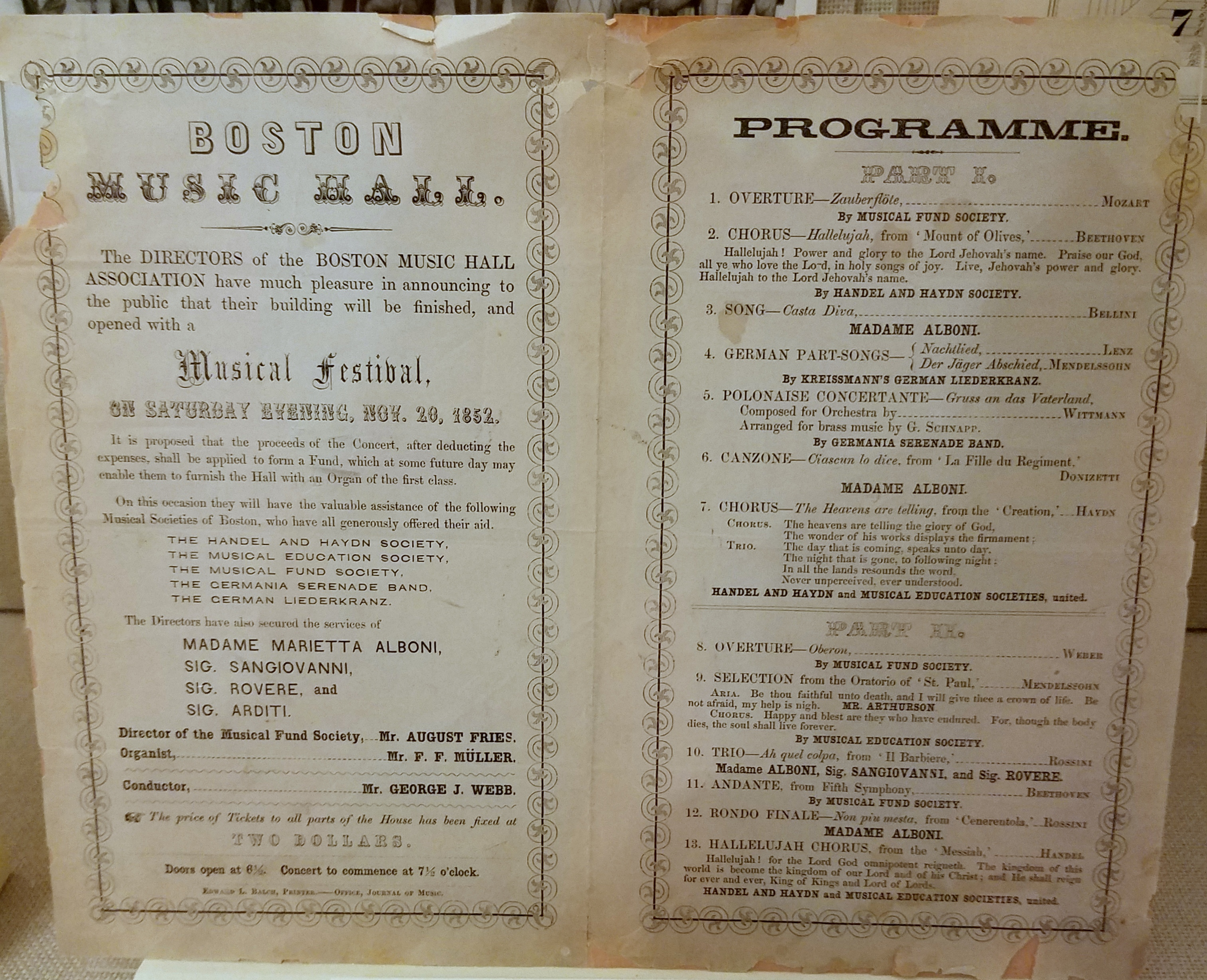
Opening night program, November 20, 1852

The Boston Music Hall was a concert hall located on Winter Street in Boston, Massachusetts, with an additional entrance on Hamilton Place.

One of the oldest continuously operating theaters in the United States, it was built in 1852 and was the original home of the Boston Symphony Orchestra. The hall closed in 1900 and was converted into a vaudeville theater named the Orpheum Theatre. The Orpheum, which still stands today, was substantially rebuilt in 1915 by architect Thomas W. Lamb as a movie theater.

The hall has no connection with Boston's "Music Hall", a theater which is now known as the Wang Theatre.

== History ==
The Boston Music Hall was built in 1852, thanks to a donation of $100,000, made by the Harvard Musical Association, for its construction. George Snell, assisted by Alpheus C. Morse, was the architect. The Handel and Haydn Society performed at the hall's inaugural concert. The world premiere of the Piano Concerto No. 1, by Pyotr Ilyich Tchaikovsky took place here. The hall was the first home of the Boston Symphony Orchestra, founded in 1881 and was also the birthplace of the New England Conservatory of Music. After being threatened by road building and subway construction, the Music Hall was replaced as the home of the Boston Symphony in 1900, by Symphony Hall.

In addition to concerts, the hall presented important speakers of the time. Theodore Parker preached here, and his congregation, the Twenty-Eighth Congregational Society, worshiped here from 1852 to 1863. Methodist minister Henry Morgan lectured in the hall c. 1859. On December 31, 1862, the eve of the day the Emancipation Proclamation took effect, Northern abolitionists gathered at the Music Hall to celebrate as the clock struck midnight. Frederick Douglass, Wendell Phillips, Harriet Beecher Stowe, William Lloyd Garrison, and Harriet Tubman attended. Oscar Wilde lectured here in 1882.

== Organ ==
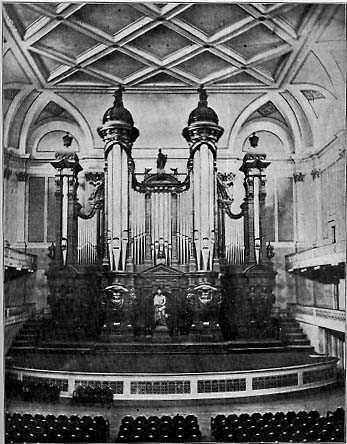
The Boston Music Hall Organ

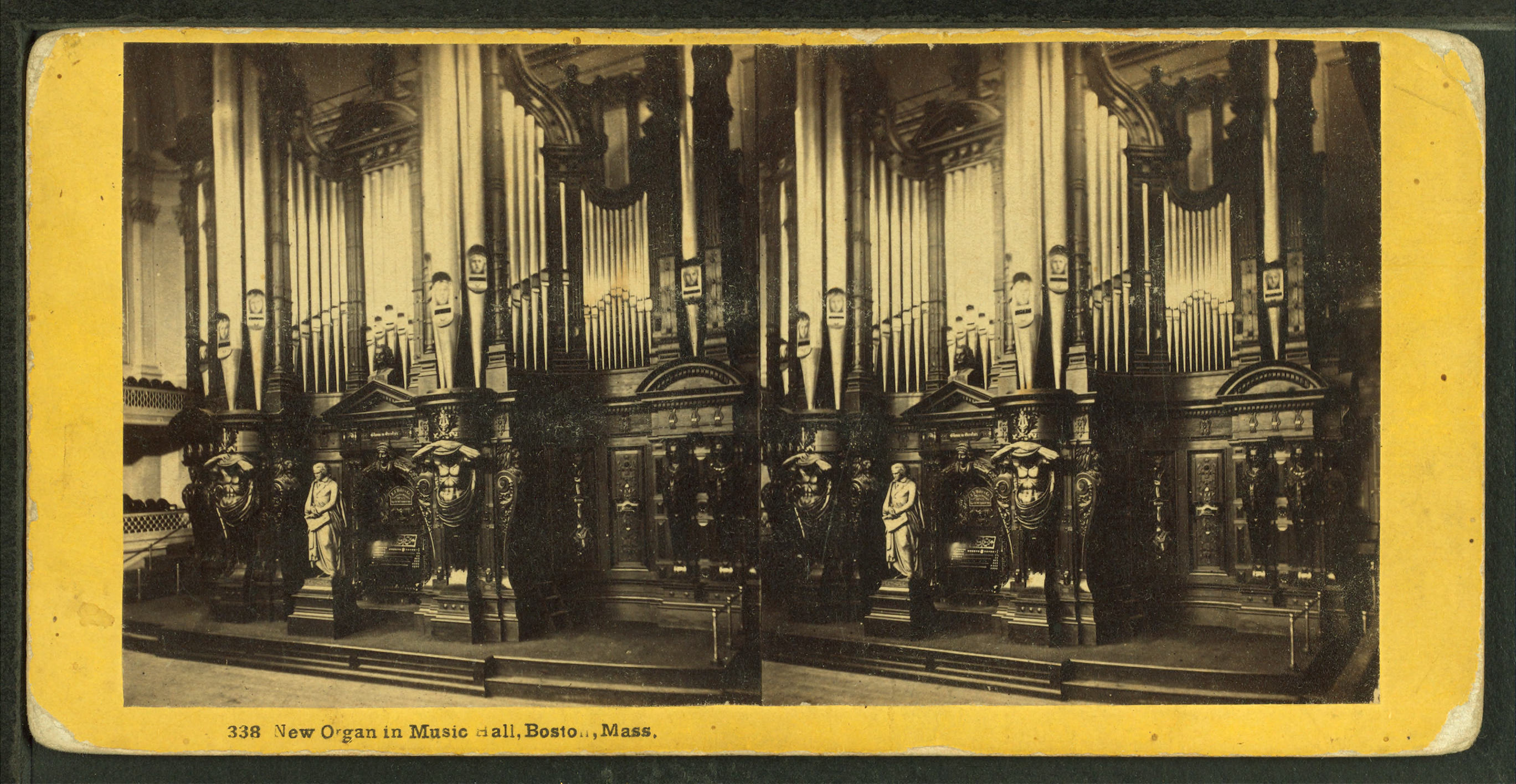
The "new" organ in a stereoscopic image by Bierstadt Brothers

The Boston Music Hall Organ, installed in 1862, was the first concert pipe organ installed in the United States. It was commissioned in 1857 and built in Germany by E.F. Walcker and Company of Ludwigsburg. It was the largest in the US at the time, containing 5,474 pipes and 84 registers.

The organ was removed from the Music Hall in 1884 to provide more performing space for the Boston Symphony. Initially put into storage, the organ was rebuilt and installed by the Methuen Organ Company in the Serlo Organ Hall in Methuen, Massachusetts, which was built to house the organ. The organ was later rebuilt again and augmented by the Aeolian-Skinner Organ Company. Today Serlo Organ Hall is known as the Methuen Memorial Music Hall and concerts are regularly presented on the organ, still considered one of the leading instruments in the US.

== Orpheum Theatre ==
When the Boston Symphony moved to Symphony Hall in 1900, the Boston Music Hall closed. It was converted for use as a vaudeville theater in 1900 and operated under a number of different names, including the Music Hall and the Empire Theatre. In 1906, it was renamed the Orpheum Theatre. In 1915, the theater was acquired by the Loew's Theatres chain and reopened again in 1916, rebuilt with a completely new interior, designed by architect Thomas W. Lamb.

== Image gallery ==
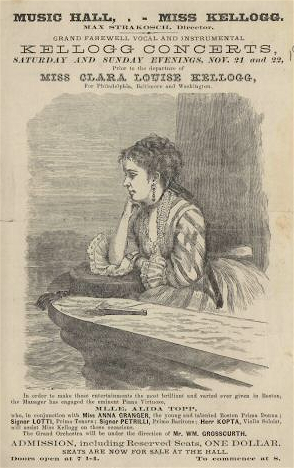
Clara Louise Kellogg concerts, 1869

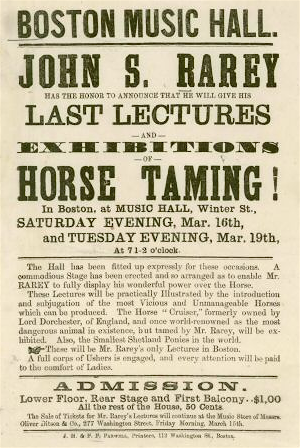
John S. Rarey's lectures and exhibitions of horse taming, c. 1865

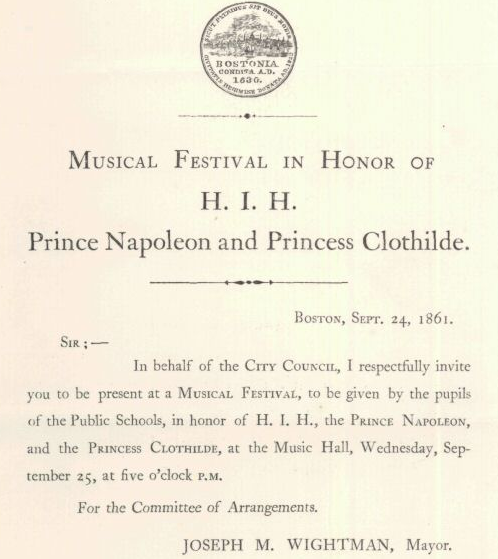
Musical festival, to be given by the pupils of the Public Schools, in honor of H.I.H., the Prince Napoleon, and the Princess Clothilde, 1861

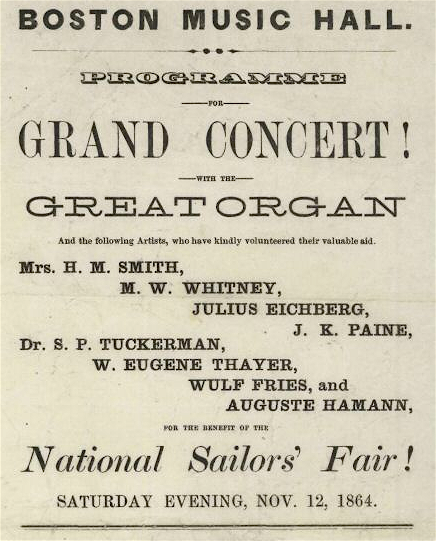
National Sailors Fair benefit, 1864

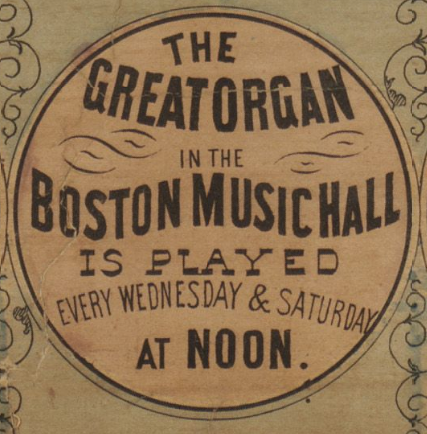
1869

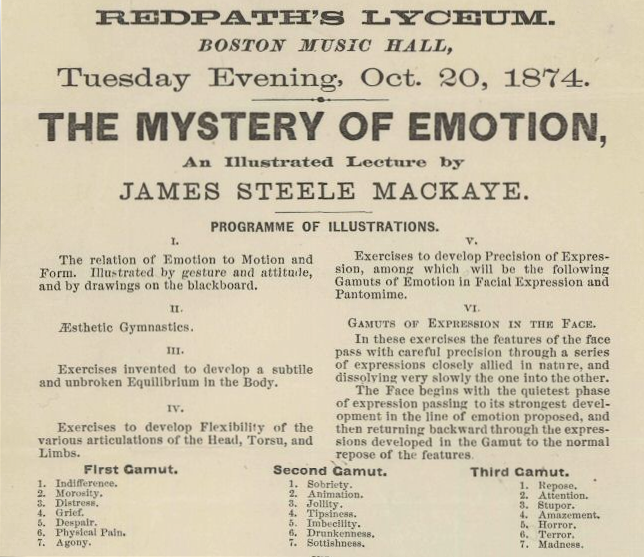
Redpath's Lyceum. Boston Music Hall, Tuesday evening, Oct. 20, 1874. The mystery of emotion, an illustrated lecture by James Steele MacKaye.
