= William T. Glidden =

Captain William T. Glidden
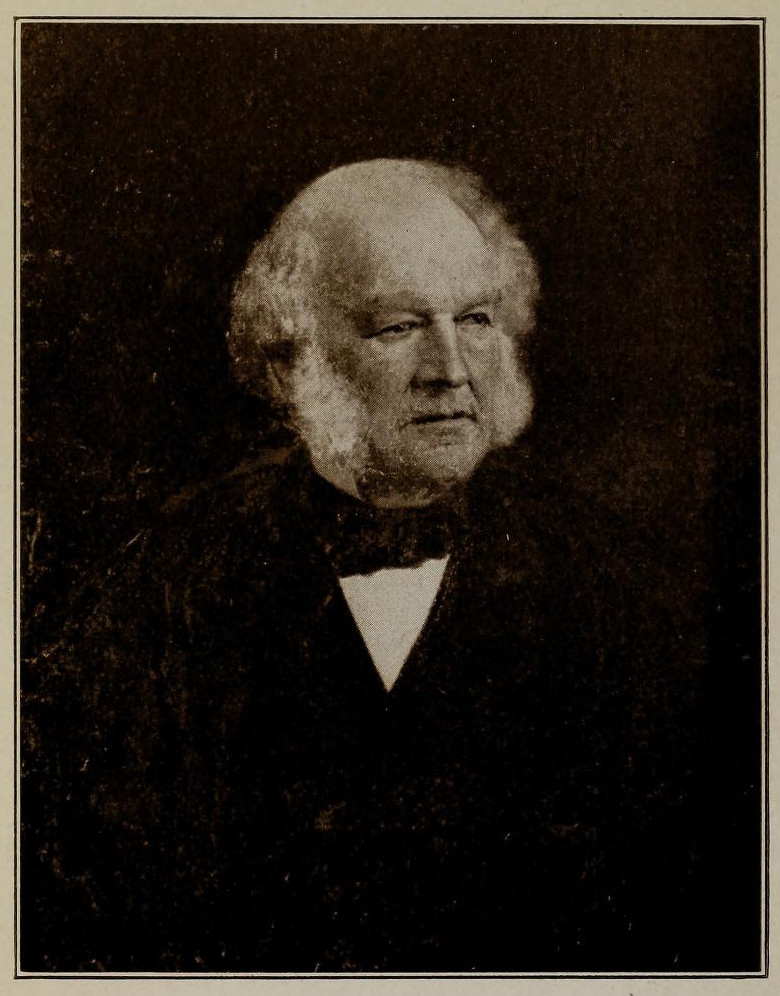
- Captain William T. Glidden
- Born: September 22, 1805; Newcastle, Massachusetts
- Died: January 28, 1893 (aged 87); Newcastle, Maine
- Occupations: Sea captain, shipping line owner
- Organization(s): Glidden & Williams

William Taylor Glidden (1805-1893) was an American ship captain, packet line co-owner and investor in railroads, including the U.S. transcontinental railroad.

== Life and career ==
Glidden was born in Newcastle, Massachusetts (it became part of Maine in 1820) on 22 September 1805. At the age of 14, he went to sea and by the time he was 21 was a captain. His trade routes were to China and Europe.

He was a partner in the clipper ship firm Glidden & Williams along with John M. S. Williams.

Glidden was an investor in the Union Pacific Railroad, as well as the associated construction company Crédit Mobilier. He eventually became a director of the former and a trustee of the latter. He also was a director of the Cedar Rapids and Missouri Railroad and the Wisconsin Central Railroad.

In 1851, Glidden became a life member of the Boston Marine Society. The Society's purpose was to provide aid to other members, mostly ship captains, and their families in times of need.

== See also ==
- St. Andrew's Church (Newcastle, Maine)
