= Walcker Orgelbau =

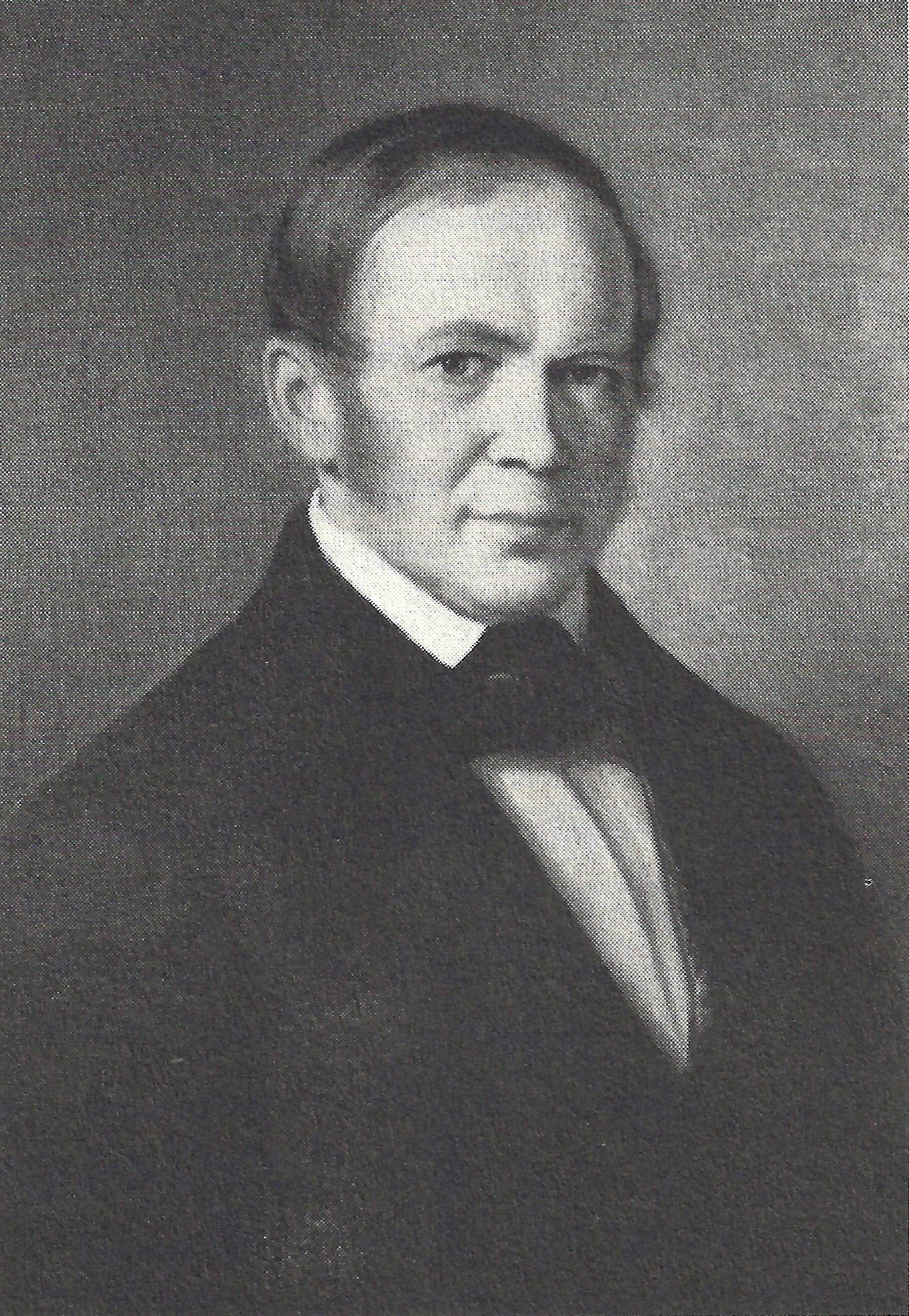
- Eberhard Friedrich Walcker
- Industry: Pipe organ design and building. Pipe organ restoration
- Founded: 1780
- Website: walcker.com

Walcker Orgelbau (also known as E. F. Walcker & Cie.) of Ludwigsburg, Baden-Württemberg, Germany, is a builder of pipe organs. It was founded in Cannstatt, a suburb of Stuttgart in 1780 by Johann Eberhard Walcker. His son Eberhard Friedrich Walcker moved the business to Ludwigsburg in 1820.

Walcker first became famous for the organ it built in the Paulskirche, Frankfurt, in 1833, which had 74 stops. Other important commissions followed rapidly, and Walcker became a pioneer of the "symphonic organ" style in Germany.

Known for distinguished installations and low output, the company built the organs for the Boston Music Hall in Boston, Massachusetts, Zagreb Cathedral in Zagreb, Croatia, University of Latvia, Riga Cathedral and Church of Luther in Riga, Latvia. The Boston instrument is now at the Methuen Memorial Music Hall in Methuen, MA.

The largest Walcker organ in the world had 220 stops and over sixteen thousand pipes. It was built in 1930s for a state congress hall in Nuremberg and was destroyed by aerial bombings during World War II.

The pipe organ located at the Metropolitan Cathedral of Medellin in Colombia is the second largest organ in South America, with more than 3000 pipes.

== Pipe organs ==
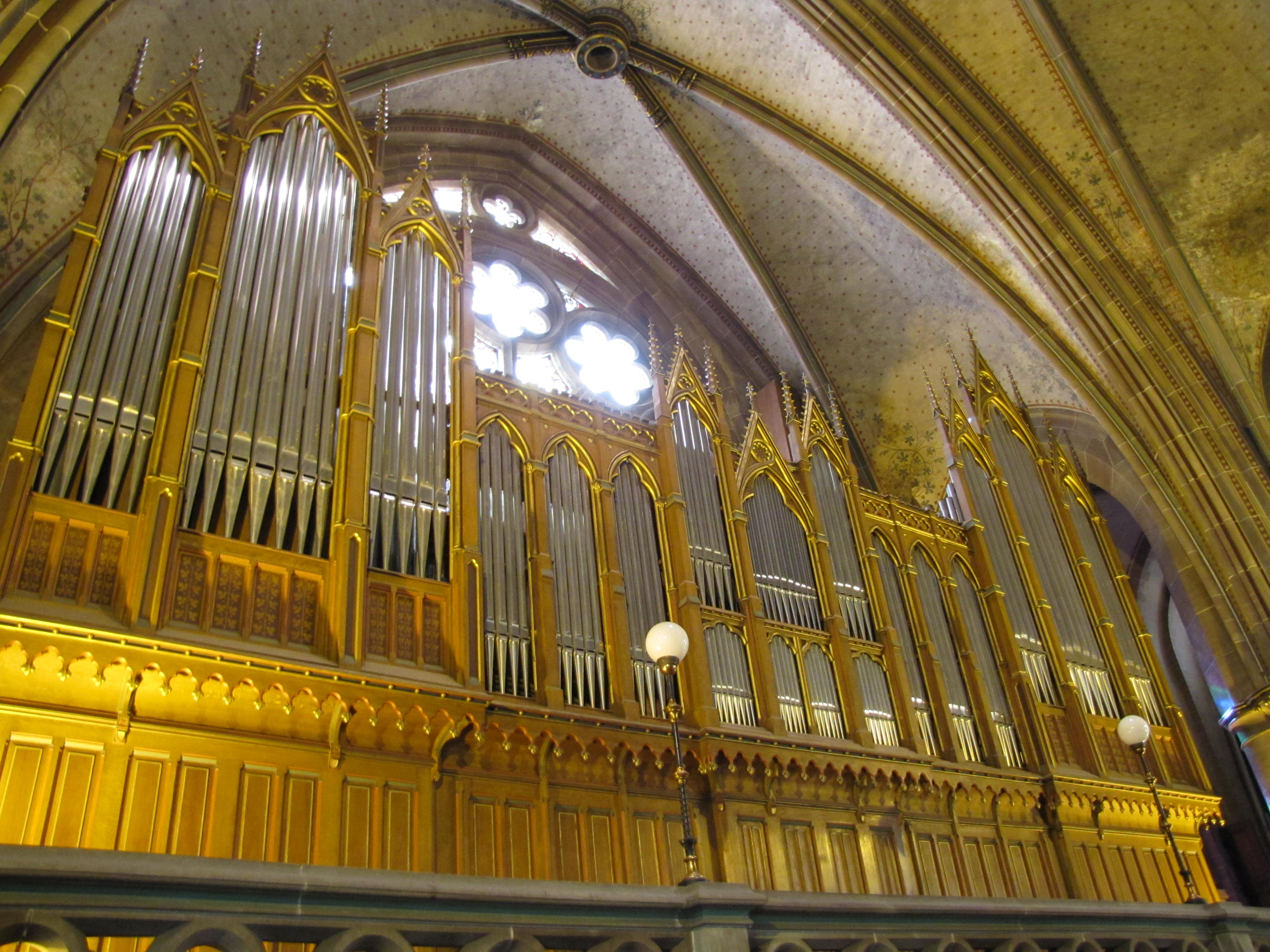
St. Paul, Strasbourg, France

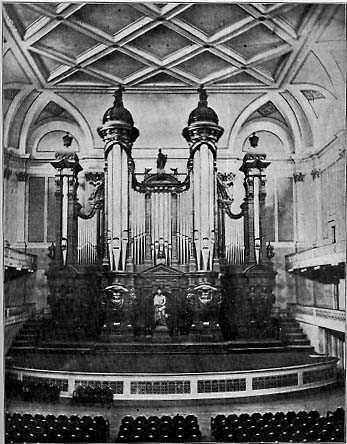
Boston Music Hall

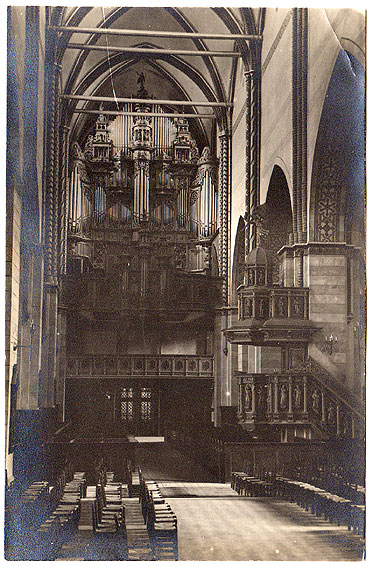
Riga Cathedral

== See also ==
- Riga Cathedral pipe organ
