= Riga Cathedral pipe organ =

Second-largest pipe organ in Latvia

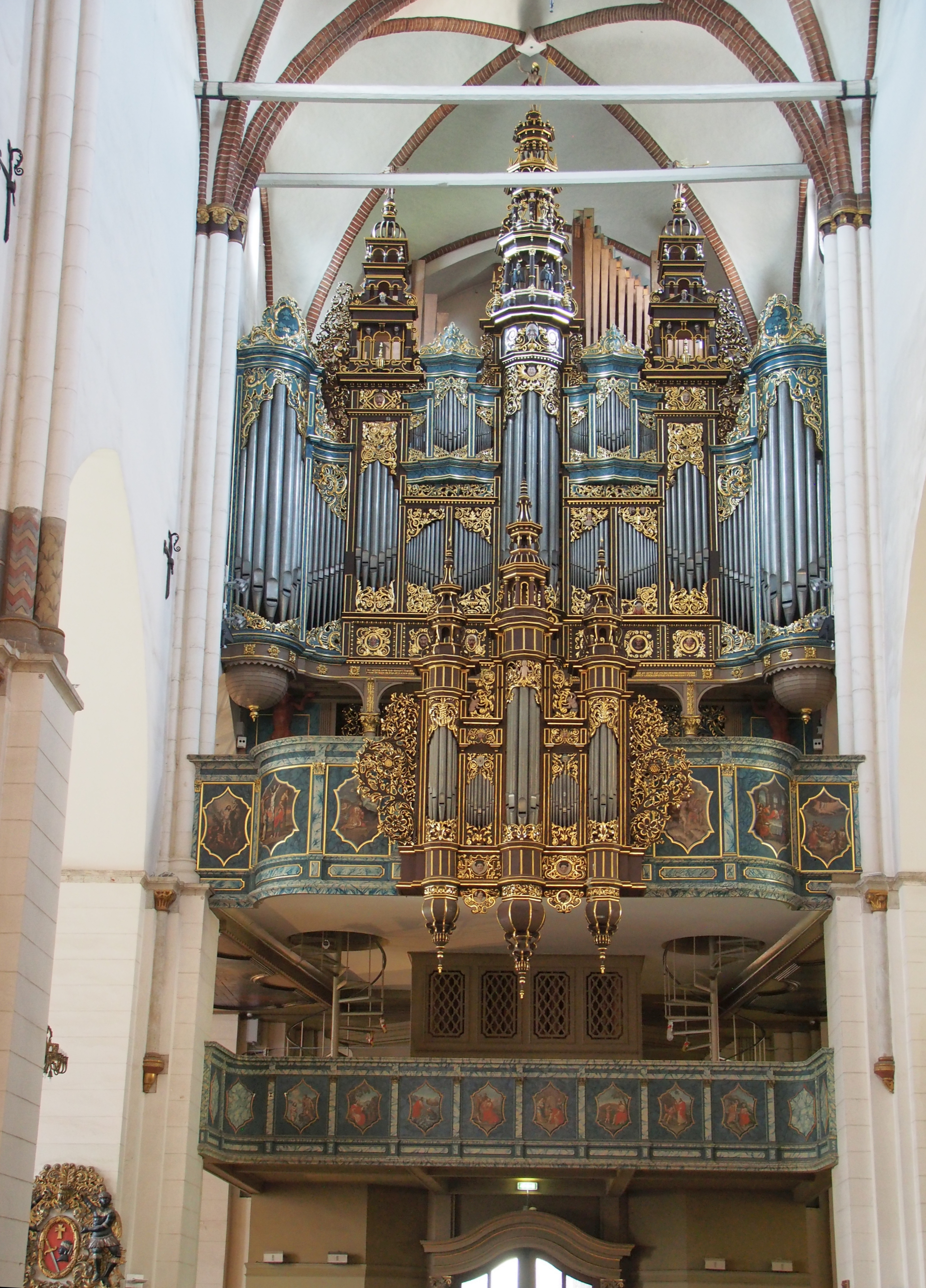
Riga Cathedral pipe organ

Dome Pipe Organ (Latvian: Doma ērģeles), the second largest pipe organ in Latvia, is located in Riga Cathedral. The largest mechanical pipe organ in Latvia is located in Liepāja Holy Trinity Cathedral.

== History ==
The first known Riga Cathedral organ was the largest in the world, but was lost in 1547 during a fire. In the 16th century, the Cathedral Church built a new organ, which sounded for 280 years. Jacob Raab made out of the damaged organ's remains a prospect in mannerism style with some baroque elements complemented later by other masters. Today the vocal organ is more than a century old; it was built by the German firm Walcker Orgelbau in Ludwigsburg in 1882-83 and was inaugurated on January 31, 1884. In 1983 the organ was reconstructed by Flentrop Orgelbouw of Zaandam, Netherlands, retaining its distinctive sound and look. During reconstruction, the organ was completely dismantled and then reassembled, the second console restored, and later were added three stops.

== Specification ==
The instrument is playable from two consoles. Its main console is located at the upper gallery and has 4 manuals and a pedal. The second console is on the lower gallery and it duplicates the fourth manual of the main console. The organ has 124 stops, which sound from 6,718 pipes arranged on 26 wind chests. The longest pipe is about 10 metres long, the shortest one is only 13 mm. Pipe diameters are from 50 cm to 4 mm. The materials used in the pipes include pine, fir, maple, oak, beech, and pear and different metal alloys. There are 116 voices, 144 ranks; 18 combinations and General Crescendo.

I Manual C–f^{3}
Principal	16′
Flauto major	16′
Viola di Gamba	16′
Octav	8′
Hohlflöte	8′
Viola di Gamba	8′
Doppelflöte	8′
Gemshorn	8′
Quintatön	8′
Bourdon	8′
Dulciana	8′
Quinte	5^{1}/_{3}′
Octav	4′
Gemshorn	4′
Gamba	4′
Hohlflöte	4′
Rohrflöte	4′
Terz	3^{1}/_{5}′
Quinte	2^{2}/_{3}′
Octav	2′
Superoctav	1′
Sesquialtera II
Cornet V	8′
Mixtur VI	4′
Scharff IV	1^{1}/_{3}′
Contrafagott	16′
Tuba mirabilis	8′
Trompette harmonique	8′
Cor anglais	8′
Euphon	8′
Clairon	4′
Cornettino	2′

II Manual C–f^{3}
Geigenprincipal	16′
Bourdon	16′
Principal	8′
Fugara	8′
Spitzflöte	8′
Rohrflöte	8′
Concertflöte	8′
Liebl. Gedeckt	8′
Viola di Alta	8′
Dolce	8′
Principal	4′
Fugara	4′
Salicet	4′
Flauto dolce	4′
Quinte	2^{2}/_{3}′
Superoctav	2′
Waldflöte	2′
Terz	1^{3}/_{5}′
Sesquialtera II
Cornet V	8′
Mixtur V	2^{2}/_{3}′
Äolodicon	16′
Ophicleide	8′
Fagott/Oboe	8′
Oboe	4′
Tremolo Fagott/Oboe

III Manual C–f^{3}
Salicional	16′
Lieblich Gedeckt	16′
Geigenprincipal	8′
Viola d’amour	8′
Wienerflöte	8′
Gedeckt	8′
Salicional	8′
Harmonika	8′
Bourdon d’echo	8′
Bifra	8′+4′
Geigenprincipal	4′
Spitzflöte	4′
Traversflöte	4′
Dolce	4′
Piccolo	2′
Mixtur IV	2^{2}/_{3}′
Vox humana	8′
Tremolo Vox humana

IV Schwellwerk C–f^{3}
Quintatön	16′
Flötenprincipal	8′
Unda maris	8′
Melodica	8′
Flûte d'Amour	8′
Bourdon doux	8′
Äoline	8′
Voix céleste	8′
Viola tremolo	8′
Piffaro	8′+2′
Flötenprincipal	4′
Gedecktflöte	4′
Vox angelica	4′
Salicet	2′
Harmonia ätheria III	2^{2}/_{3}′
Trompete	8′
Physharmonika	8′

Pedal C–d^{1}
Principalbaß	32′
Offenbaß	16′
Violonbaß	16′
Contraviolonbaß	16′
Subbaß	16′
Flötenbaß	16′
Gedecktbaß	16′
Quintbaß	10^{2}/_{3}′
Octavbaß	8′
Hohlflötenbaß	8′
Gedecktbaß	8′
Violoncello	8′
Terzbaß	6^{2}/_{5}′
Octavbaß	4′
Hohlflöte	4′
Octav	2′
Sesquialtera II
Mixtur V	5^{1}/_{3}′
Grand Bourdon V	32′
Bombardon	32′
Posaune	16′
Trompete	8′
Corno	4′

Schwellpedal C–d^{1}
Violon	16′
Bourdon	16′
Dolceflöte	8′
Violon	8′
Viola	4′
Flautino	2′
Serpent	16′
Bassethorn	8′

- Couplers: II/I, III/I, IV/I, III/II, IV/II, I/P, II/P, III/P, IV/P, I–IV/P, P/I („noli me tangere“).
