= Glidden & Williams =

American shipping company

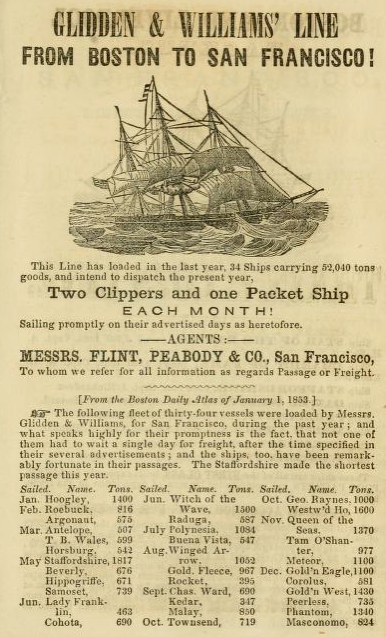
Glidden & Williams advertisement in Disturnell's American and European railway and steamship guide

Glidden & Williams was a Boston-based clipper ship packet line which ran ships primarily between Boston and California in the 1850s and 1860s. It was a partnership between William T. Glidden and John M. S. Williams, formed in 1849.

== Overview ==
Over the years Glidden & Williams owned over 50 ships, although not all at the same time due to losses and sales. In its heyday the firm ran about one ship per month to California. It also ran ships to other destinations, including China.

The importance of clipper ships in international trade declined after the 1860s, and the firm was dissolved in 1877. Both William Glidden and John Williams remained involved in other ventures though. Glidden was an investor and director for several railroads, including the Union Pacific. Williams was involved in politics and was elected a member of the US House of Representatives.

== Images ==
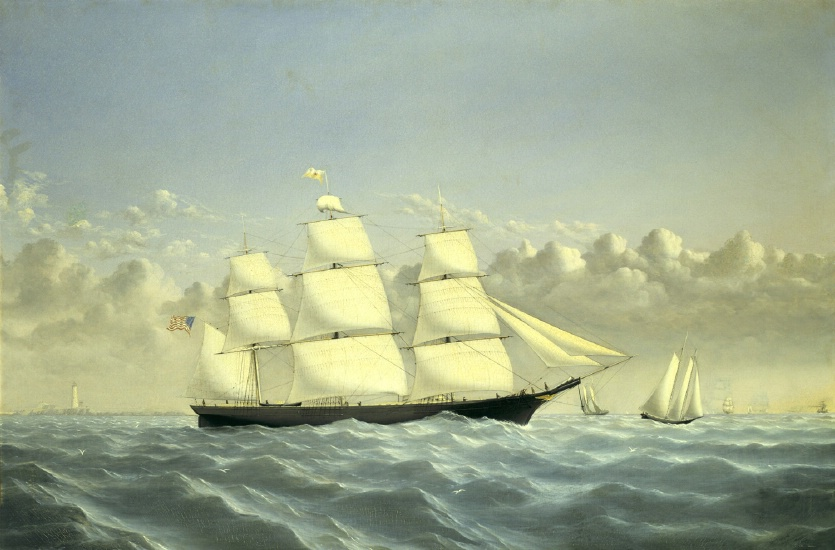
Clipper ship Golden West outward bound 1852

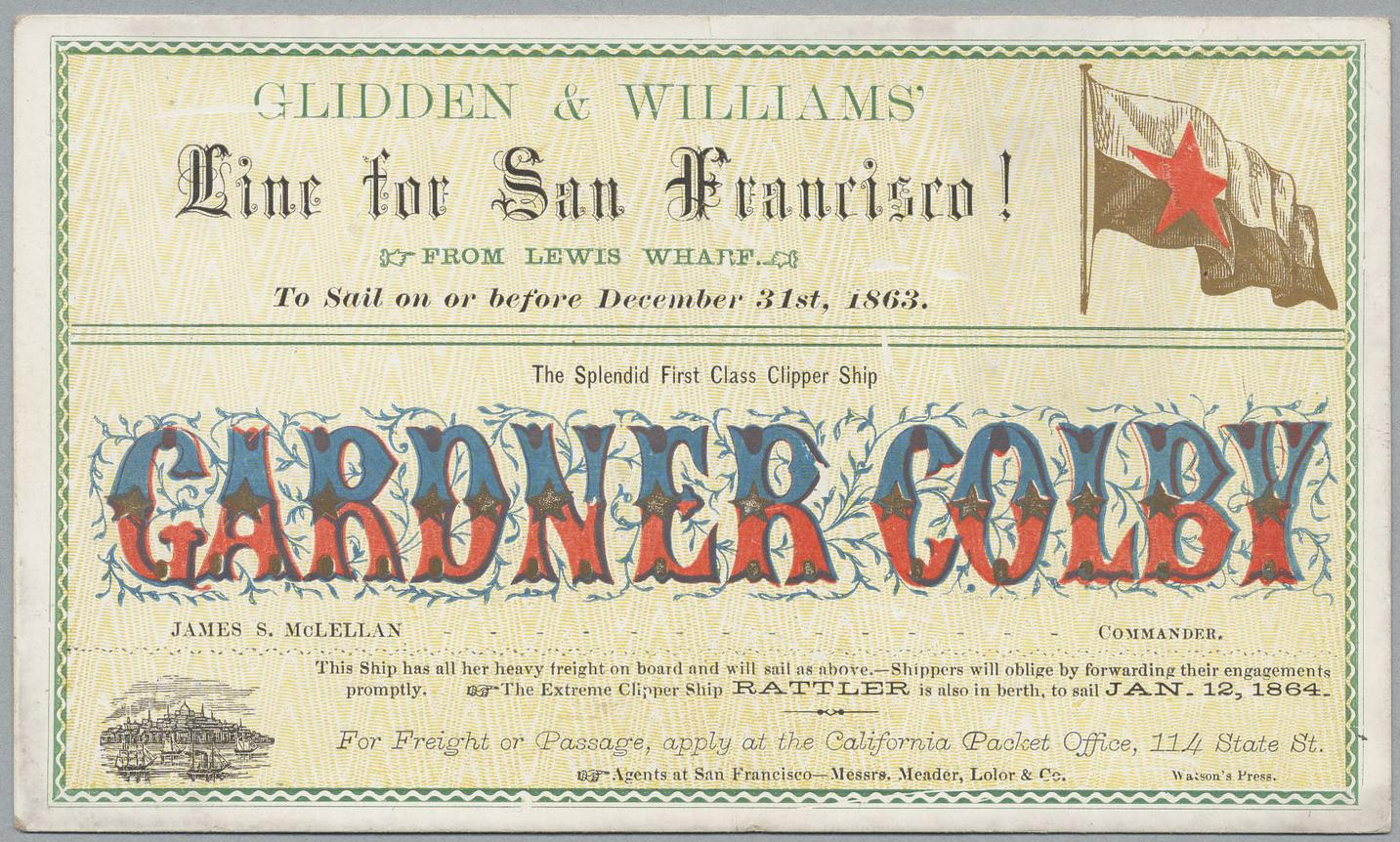
Sailing card for the Gardner Colby

Flag of the Glidden & Williams Line

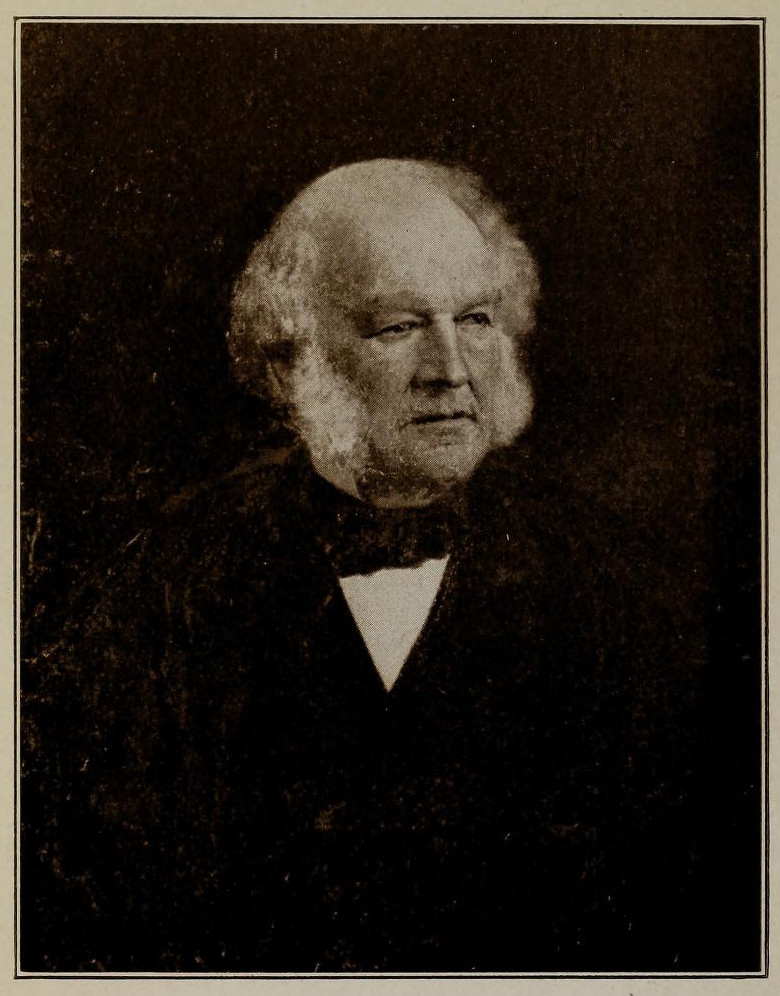
William T. Glidden

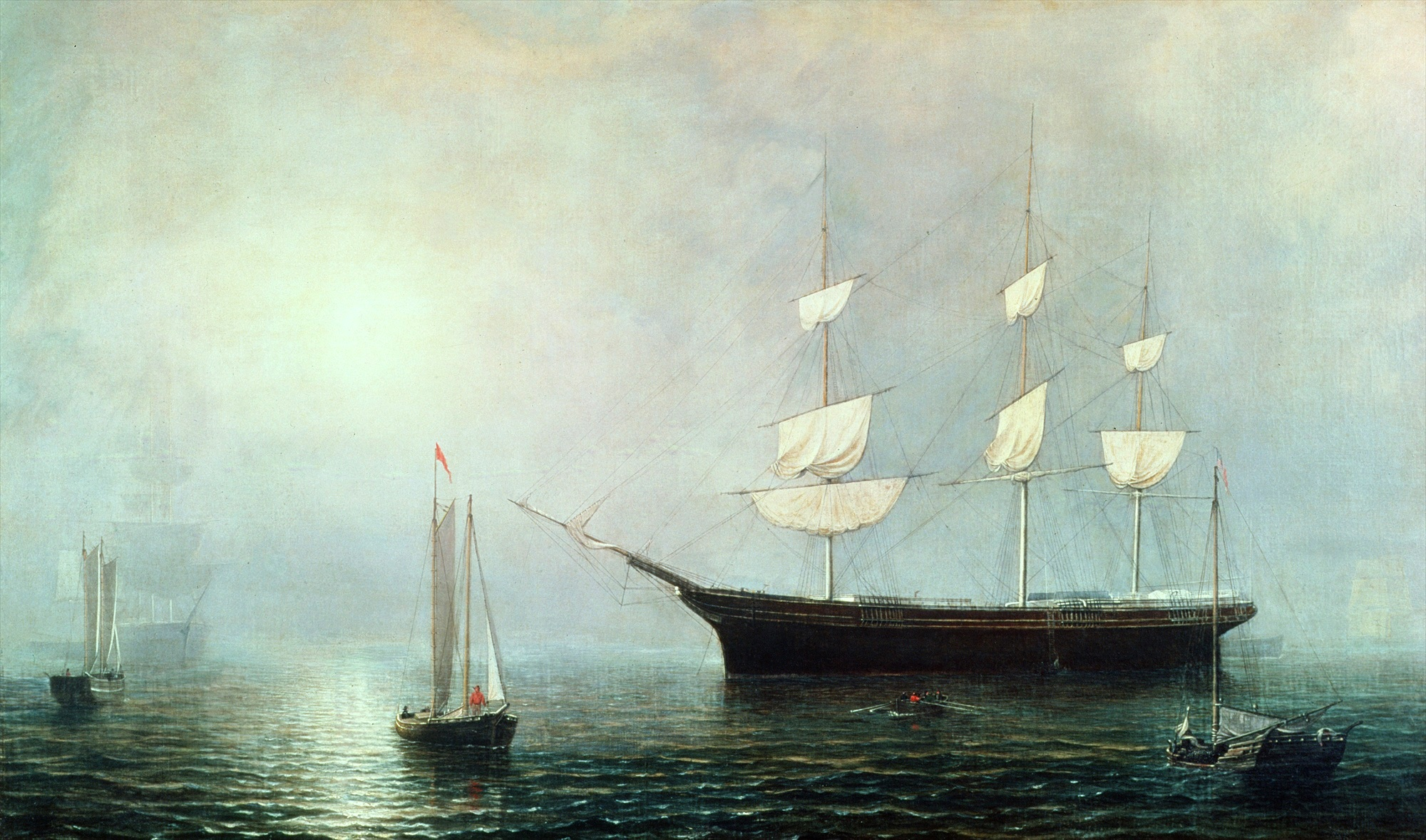
Starlight in harbor, by Fitz Henry Lane

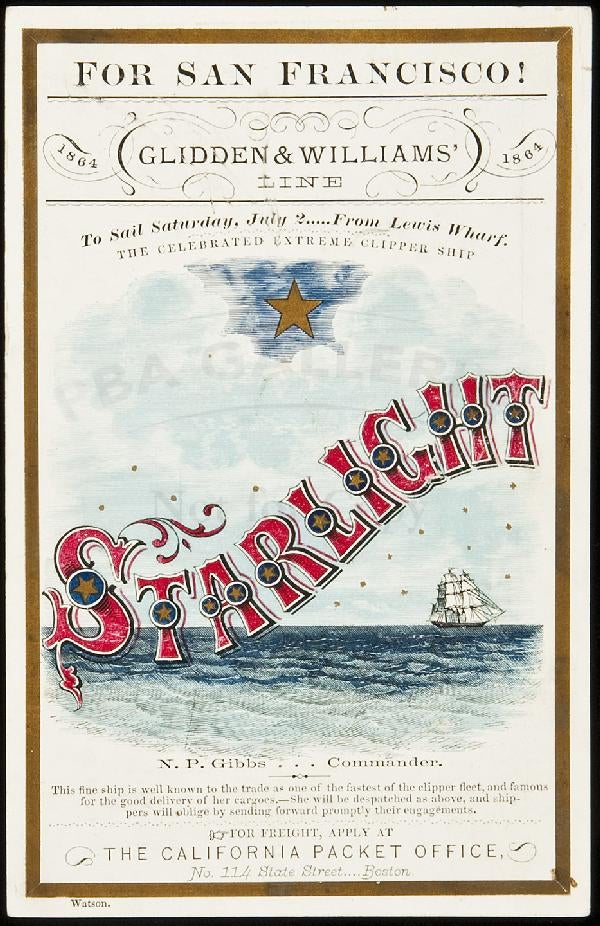
Starlight sailing card
