= John M. S. Williams =

American politician (1818–1886)

Member of the U.S. House of Representatives from 's 8th district
- In office March 4, 1873 – March 3, 1875
- Preceded by: George Frisbie Hoar
- Succeeded by: William W. Warren

Member of the Massachusetts State Senate
- In office 1858

Member of the Massachusetts House of Representatives
- In office 1856

Personal details
- Born: August 13, 1818 Richmond, Virginia, U.S.
- Died: March 19, 1886 (aged 84) Cambridge, Massachusetts, U.S.
- Resting place: Mount Auburn Cemetery
- Party: Republican
- Occupation: Merchant; politician

John McKeown Snow Williams (August 13, 1818 – March 19, 1886) was an American politician. A member of the Republican Party, he was member of the United States House of Representatives from Massachusetts.

== Early life ==
Born in Richmond, Virginia, Williams moved to Boston, Massachusetts. He attended the public schools, and engaged in the mercantile and shipping business as a partner in the packet shipping firm Glidden & Williams, which operated clippers between Boston and San Francisco. He later became involved in other business ventures, including the Union Pacific Railroad.

== Political career ==
He was a member of the Massachusetts Emigrant Aid Society in 1854. (The Emigrant Aid Society financed the settlement in Kansas Territory of farmers opposed to slavery as an attempt to prevent Kansas from being settled by slave owners.) Williams served as member of the Massachusetts House of Representatives in 1856, and the Massachusetts State Senate in 1858.

Williams was elected as a Republican to the Forty-third Congress (March 4, 1873 – March 3, 1875). He was defeated for reelection in 1874 to the Forty-fourth Congress, and resumed his former business pursuits.

== Death ==
He died in Cambridge, Massachusetts, March 19, 1886, and was interred in Mount Auburn Cemetery.

== Notes ==
U.S. House of Representatives
Preceded by George F. Hoar	Member of the U.S. House of Representatives from Massachusetts's 8th congressional district March 4, 1873 – March 3, 1875	Succeeded by William W. Warren
