= Methuen Memorial Music Hall =

Coordinates: 42°43′29″N 71°11′07″W

- U.S. National Register of Historic Places
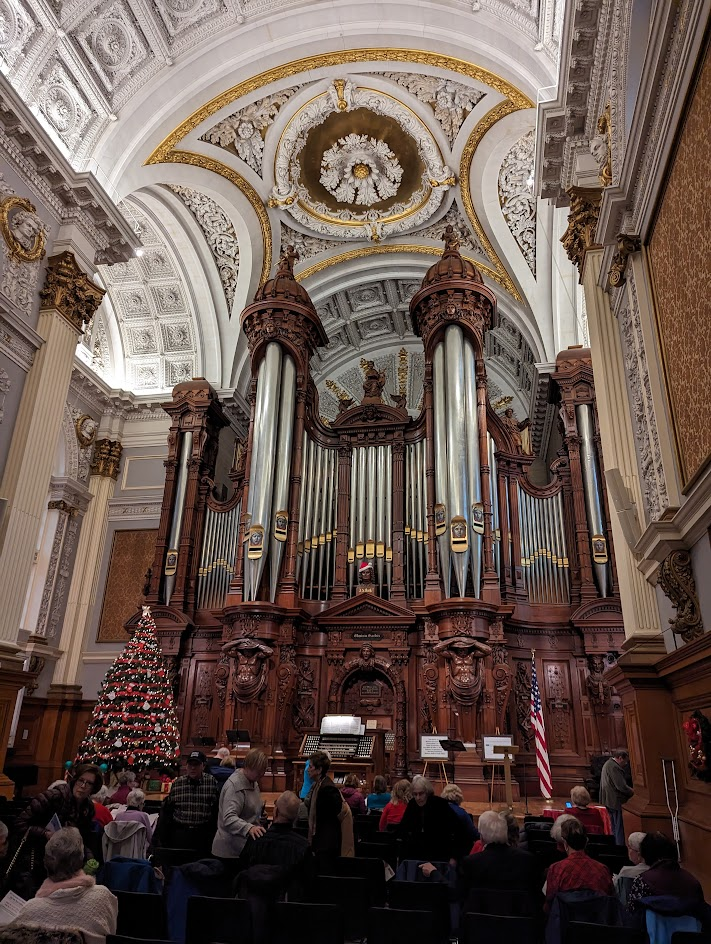
- The organ in 2023 during a holiday performance
- Location: 192 Broadway; Methuen, Massachusetts
- Built: 1909
- Architect: Henry Vaughan
- NRHP reference No.: 78000462
- Added to NRHP: December 14, 1978

Methuen Memorial Music Hall, initially named Serlo Organ Hall, is a music hall built by Edward Francis Searles to house "The Great Organ", a very large pipe organ originally built for the Boston Music Hall. The hall was completed in 1909, and stands at 192 Broadway in Methuen, Massachusetts.

== The Organ ==
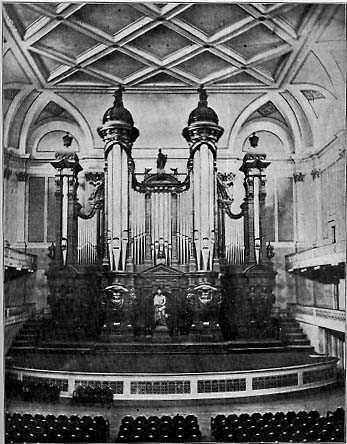
Organ in its original installation at the Boston Music Hall

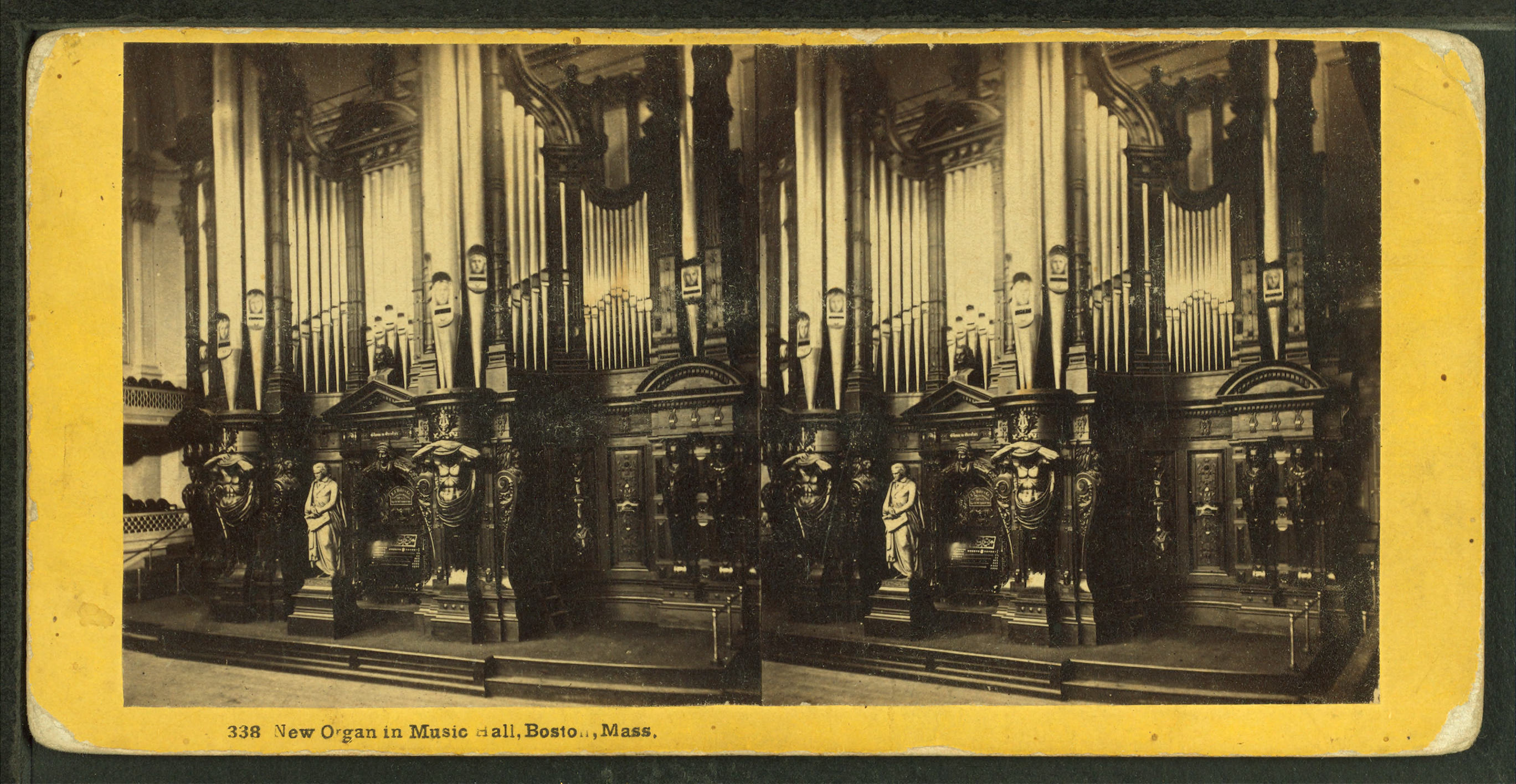
The then-new organ installed at Boston Music Hall, in a stereoscopic image by Bierstadt Brothers

"The Great Organ" was built by the E. F. Walcker Company of Ludwigsburg, Germany. It arrived in the US from Europe in March 1863, with installation completed in November 1863. It was at the time believed to be the largest pipe organ in the United States. Since then the count has gone up to its present 6,088 pipes and 84 registers. It was the first concert organ in the United States and was installed at the Boston Music Hall.

The organ case was made of American black walnut by the Herter Brothers of New York, for whom Searles had once worked, and is based on a case design by Hammatt Billings. The display pipes were manufactured from burnished Cornish tin.

In 1881, the Boston Symphony Orchestra was founded, and the Boston Music Hall was their first home. The orchestra required a lot of space for the performers. With the rise in popularity of orchestral concerts, interest in organ recitals declined. The organ was removed to storage in 1884 and then sold for $5,000 to William O. Grover. Grover probably intended to donate the organ to the New England Conservatory of Music, but after his death circa 1897, it was auctioned to settle his estate. Searles purchased it at auction for $1,500 and began construction of a music hall in Methuen.

== Architecture ==
In 1899, Searles hired noted church architect Henry Vaughan, an architect he frequently hired for various projects, to design a concert hall for the organ to be located on property he owned adjoining the Spicket River. Probably no other building of this size has been built solely to house a pipe organ.

The exterior is brick in an Anglo-Dutch style, with an Italianate campanile and a gable with baroque volutes. The walls are over three feet thick with interior air gaps, making the building quite soundproof.

The hall is designed in a similar fashion to a church, having a cross shaped floorplan; a long central aisle ends at a stage in front of the pipe organ; including the organ, the hall is approximately 100 feet (30 m) long. Another aisle runs across the front of the stage area and out to the sides; this is 70 feet (21 m) wide.

In the terminology of Christian church architecture, the nave is 40 feet (12 m) wide while the transepts extend to 70 feet (21 m), and the pipe organ is in the chancel.

There is a vaulted ceiling 65 feet (20 m) high. Beneath the vault is an entablature whose cornice hides indirect lighting which illuminates and reflects off the ceiling. There is also a catwalk where the vault of the ceiling meets the top of the walls. The total enclosed volume is over 300,000 cubic feet (8,500 m^{3}), which gives a reverberation time of 4 seconds when the hall is empty.

The interior is designed in an English baroque style. It draws particularly from Christopher Wren's design for the Church of Saint Stephen, Walbrook, in London. The lower 10 feet (3.0 m) of wall surface are finished with dark oak paneling. The walls above that are plaster with brocade panels which in addition to their decorative appearance are placed to absorb excess reverberation. The floors are marble in an alternating color scheme of reddish-brown and gray.

== History ==
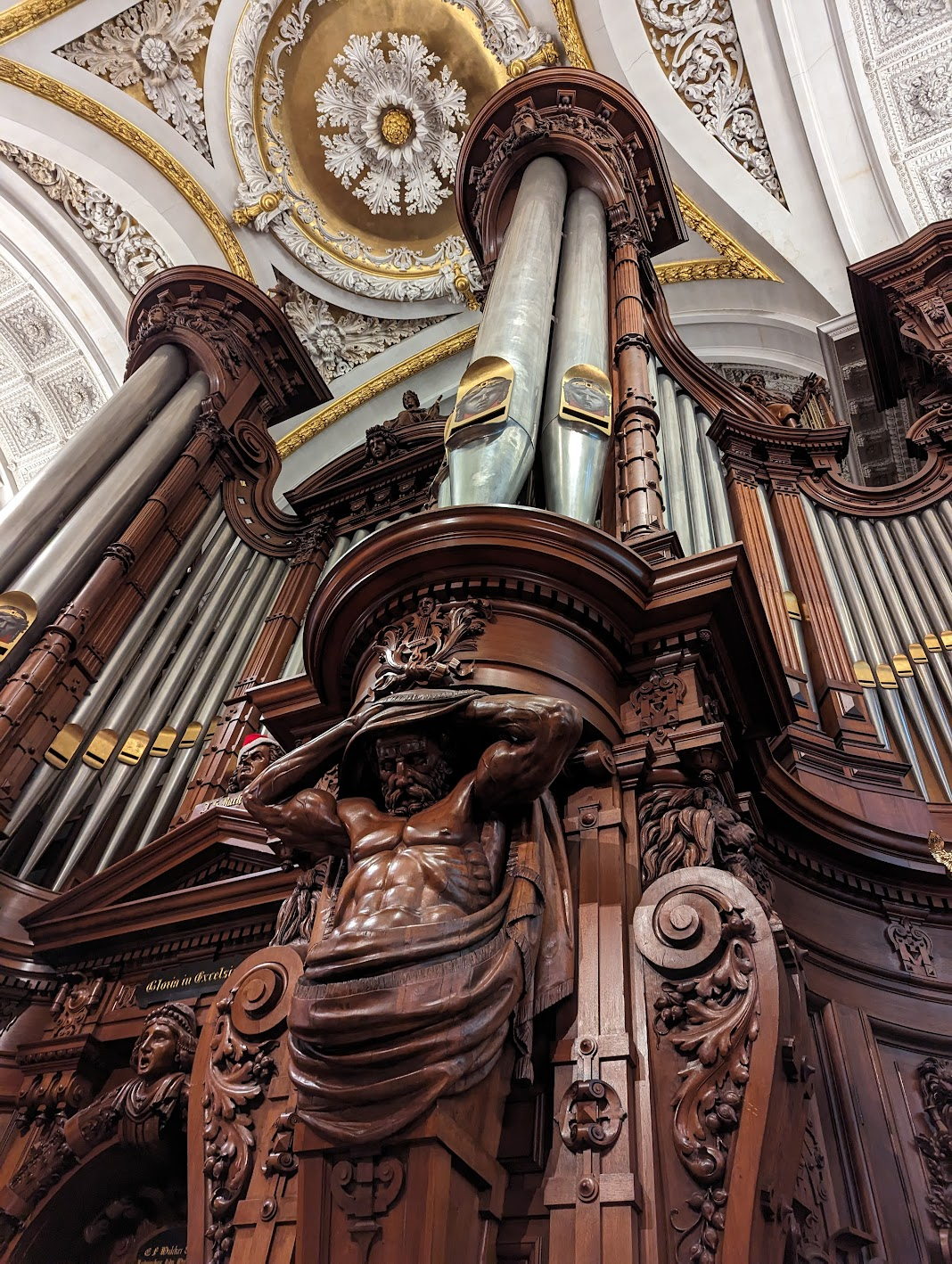
Detail of the organ's ornaments

After the hall's completion, it was used privately by Searles until his death in 1920. It then passed to Searles' secretary, Arthur Thomas Walker, as residuary legatee. Walker died in 1927, leaving the hall to his niece, Ina Cecil McEachran of Detroit.

In 1930, part of the property including the hall was purchased by Lillian Wightman Andrew (1882-1961), wife of local banker Francis Martin Andrew (1880–1967). In 1931, the hall was purchased by noted organbuilder Ernest M. Skinner for a mere $10,000.

Under Skinner's ownership, there were public choral and organ performances which included works by Brahms, Bach, and Handel, with recitals by organists including Marcel Dupré and E. Power Biggs. In 1936, Skinner incorporated an organ building company on the property, "Ernest M. Skinner and Son Company", using the Methuen Organ Company factory building which was attached to the music hall by a covered walkway.

This business initially prospered, building several notable pipe organs including the one for the National Cathedral in Washington, D.C. The National Cathedral was designed by Henry Vaughan, who designed the music hall. The Second World War caused the failure of the company, and in August 1942 the company assets, including the music hall, were transferred to trustees Arthur T. Wasserman and Matthew Brown as protection from creditors.

In 1943, a court decree allowed the Essex Savings Bank of Lawrence to sell the property in order to pay mortgages held by the Andrews and Skinner's son, Richmond H. Skinner. In June 1943, a fire destroyed the organ factory building, but the music hall was largely undamaged. In July, the mortgage sale was completed, with Essex Savings Bank buying the property at auction for $55,000.

In May 1946, eight local residents founded a charitable organization to buy and maintain the music hall, operating it as a cultural center. In 1947 the Aeolian-Skinner Organ Company was engaged to rebuild the organ. The tonal structure of the organ was changed and a new detached console was added.

== Current usage ==
The Great Organ is the center piece of the Hall and the 15-week Summer Organ Concert series represents the flagship events of the season in addition to piano, vocal, and instrumental performances. The Hall is frequently rented for weddings, private and public gatherings, corporate events and other performances. As a venue, it offers the unusual characteristic of looking like a traditional church while having no religious symbolism or affiliation. The Hall is currently open from early spring through December, finishing the season with a fan favorite holiday concert.

== See also ==
- National Register of Historic Places listings in Methuen, Massachusetts
- National Register of Historic Places listings in Essex County, Massachusetts
