= Alexander McCurdy =

Alexander McCurdy Jr.
- McCurdy at Curtis Institute of Music, Philadelphia, 1940s

Background information
- Born: Alexander McCurdy Jr. August 18, 1905; Eureka, California
- Died: June 1, 1983 (aged 77) Philadelphia, Pennsylvania
- Genres: classical music
- Occupations: organist, choirmaster, educator
- Instrument: organ
- Years active: c.1915–1972

Alexander McCurdy Jr. (August 18, 1905 in Eureka, California – June 1, 1983 in Philadelphia, Pennsylvania) was an organist and educator who taught a generation of America's most-prominent performers.

== Education and family ==
After overcoming early struggles with infantile paralysis, McCurdy moved east to study organ with T. Tertius Noble. Dr. Noble was unable to take any more students and so suggested that McCurdy study instead with the great Lynnwood Farnam, first in New York (1924–1927) and then in Philadelphia's newly established Curtis Institute of Music. In 1931, McCurdy became one of the Institute's earliest graduates, and received his diploma at the first official commencement ceremony in 1934. He had already made his professional concert debut at New York's Town Hall in 1926, and thereafter toured as a recitalist, often in duo performances with his wife since 1932, harpist Flora Greenwood. They had two children, Alexander "Sandy" McCurdy III (a prominent minister and psychoanalyst) and Xandra McCurdy Schultz (whose son produced a televised mini-documentary about his organist grandfather).

== Career and musical legacy ==
McCurdy was organist and choirmaster at St. Luke's Episcopal Church in San Francisco from 1921 until 1924. He became organist and choirmaster at Philadelphia's Second Presbyterian Church in 1927, where he greatly enlarged the pipe organ. After a 1949 merger, this was the First Presbyterian Church in Philadelphia, from which he retired in 1971.

McCurdy headed the organ department at Philadelphia's Curtis Institute from 1935 to 1972 and also at Princeton's Westminster Choir College (later part of Rider University) from 1940 to 1965, where he received an honorary doctorate at the conclusion of his tenure. He taught hundreds of organ students over the years, with many becoming prominent concert performers, composers and educators. These included Walter Baker, Richard Purvis, David N. Johnson, Gordon Young, David Craighead, Thomas Schippers, James Litton, Barbara Owen, Temple Painter, Robert Carwithen, Hedley Yost, John Weaver, Joan Hult Lippincott, William S. Wrenn, William Whitehead, George W. Decker, Cherry Rhodes, John Binsfeld, Keith Chapman, David Spicer, John Tuttle, Michael Stairs, Gordon Turk, Karl Watson, and Charles Callahan.

McCurdy's students generally manifested a sublime lyricism in playing, and more than a few shared his affinity for the Symphonic school of pipe-organ design. This affinity has helped preserve several important symphonic organs in Philadelphia, particularly the Wanamaker Organ, the E.M. Skinner organ at Girard College Chapel, and the Curtis Organ at Irvine Auditorium (University of Pennsylvania).

On May 13, 2005, Westminster Choir College celebrated McCurdy’s centennial year with a daylong series of concerts and remembrances at the Princeton University Chapel and Westminster’s Bristol Chapel, including featured performances by Weaver, Lippincott, Tuttle, and Stairs. For many years, Westminster held the annual "Alexander McCurdy Competition in Organ Performance" among its students.

McCurdy bequeathed his music collection to the Bagaduce Music Lending Library.

== Selected works ==
- "Notable Organs of America," Alexander McCurdy, The Etude, June 1947.
- "Keeping Up Mendelssohn," Alexander McCurdy, The Etude, February 1948.
- "Music for Harp and Organ," Alexander McCurdy, The Etude, September 1954 (including cover photo with his wife).
