= Keith Chapman (organist) =

American concert organist (1945-1989)

- Chapman at the 6-manual Wanamaker Organ console
- Born: July 16, 1945; San Mateo, California
- Died: June 29, 1989 (aged 43); The Colorado Rockies
- Known for: Wanamaker Organist, Philadelphia, Pennsylvania

Keith Chapman (1945–1989) was an American concert organist known best for his flair at playing in the symphonic style of organ performance, and particularly for his long and distinguished association (1966–1989) with the Wanamaker's Department Store of Philadelphia as the principal organist of the Wanamaker Organ.

== Early history ==
Chapman was born on July 16, 1945 in San Bruno, California and grew up in San Bruno, California. An organ prodigy, he began formal study at age 5 with S. Leslie Grow, a student of Marcel Dupré. Chapman was the accompanist to the Capuchino High School Concert Choir while it was directed by Otto Mielenz. Having studied with Richard Purvis, the organist at the time of Grace Cathedral, San Francisco, Chapman eventually took up post there as Assistant Organist.

Chapman came to Philadelphia where he attended the Curtis Institute of Music from 1964 to 1968, studying organ under Alexander McCurdy who had also been Purvis's teacher. Chapman received a master's degree from Temple University in 1971 and an honorary doctor of musical arts degree from Combs College of Music in Philadelphia in 1978. He also had several original compositions and arrangements published for organ solo.

In addition to his appointment at Wanamaker's, Chapman performed with the Philadelphia Orchestra and served as organist and choirmaster at Philadelphia's First Presbyterian Church, Wayne United Methodist Church in suburban Philadelphia, and Reform Congregation Keneseth Israel.

== Association with Wanamaker ==
Chapman was appointed principal organist at Wanamaker's in 1966 at age 20 while he was still a student at Curtis. He would preside over the largest fully playable organ in the world, and would remain at that position for the next 23 years until his untimely death in 1989.

At the time of Chapman's appointment, the Wanamaker Organ had been underused. As one of his first projects, Chapman arranged for the broadcast of Wanamaker concerts which were heard over Philadelphia radio station WUHY (now WHYY-FM) and included his own commentaries about the performances and the organ.

Chapman regularly welcomed visitors into the loft containing the organ console and permitted them to sit during performances. He also allowed visitors to be photographed with him on the organ bench. In addition to several known instances of Chapman playing practical jokes on customers at the store, he was also known for multitasking while performing by playing chess, reading newspaper stories aloud, or bantering with listeners in the loft.

=== Compositions ===
Keith Chapman published a number of pieces, most of which are arrangements of hymns or well-known melodies set in his personal style. They emphasize accent and rhythm for the faster pieces and harmonic variation in all of them, reminiscent of Debussy and Ravel. It is thought likely that many of these works began as improvisations from his daily work at Wanamaker's, where standard numbers, particularly Christmas selections, could be explored through experiment in the daily repetition. Chapman was a practical composer who sought to captivate appreciative audiences and achieve commercial success, while supplying the polished detail and variation that serious musicians would appreciate. Some pieces, such as an improvisation on "We Gather Together" or an arrangement of "Ding Dong Merrily on High" made reference to other compositions ("All Creatures of Our God and King" and "In Dir ist Freude", respectively here). His "Fanfare and Procession" is thought to be a totally original work. He tended to play some of his faster, livelier pieces slightly ahead of the beat, with rhythm invariably being a strong factor. He championed the beauty of the symphonic sound of the pipe organ during an era when it was aggressively criticized by the "musically correct" of the period. Chapman said that an unfulfilled ambition was to be an orchestra conductor. Rights to much of his music are held by Sony Corporation, and attempts at re-publication have not yet (2017) met with success, although performance rights have been granted.

=== Recordings ===
At the time of Chapman's death, it was thought that all copies of his historic broadcasts had been destroyed. Eventually it was discovered that two enthusiasts of the Wanamaker Organ had reproduced digitally remastered recordings of these radio broadcasts of very high quality. The Friends of the Wanamaker Organ organization was able to reissue on compact disk three of the half-hour performances. These recordings are of special significance because, shortly after Chapman's death, both the Echo and Ethereal divisions of the organ were damaged in separate accidents and became unplayable for many years. Other recordings include:

- The Grand Court Organ (1973)
- Mussorgsky's Pictures at an Exhibition (1975)
- Airs & Arabesques (1976)
- Chapman/Wanamaker - The Memorial Release - Vantage VCD 6304
- The Complete Chapman/Wanamaker Recordings - Vantage V2CD 69-694-001
- Keith Chapman - The "Lost Radio Broadcasts" - Vantage V2CD-698-002
- Keith Chapman - The "Lost Radio Broadcasts, Vol. 2" - Vantage WanaRadio2
- Keith Chapman - "Karg-Elert Instrumental Works" - Motette CD60351
- Keith Chapman - "The Wanamaker Store Organ", Karg-Elert, Jongen, Alain, Langlais, Daquin... - PCD60351

After his death, many of Chapman's arrangements were published in At the Organ With Keith Chapman. Warner Brothers Publications. March 2000. ISBN 9780769250878.

=== Diamond Anniversary Concert ===
In 1986, Chapman was featured artist for the landmark concert at the Wanamaker Grand Court that celebrated his 20th anniversary as Wanamaker Organist and the Organ's 75th anniversary. Sponsored by the Wayne Concert Series, this was the first after-hours public organ concert at Wanamaker's in some 50 years. The tradition has been continued into the present day, largely under the auspices of the non-profit organization, The Friends of the Wanamaker Organ.

The 1986 concert was recorded, and has been released on DVD by the Friends of the Wanamaker Organ. Also included is a 2009 update on the restoration of the instrument.

== Death ==
Chapman and his wife, Sally, were killed when their twin-engine Cessna 310 crashed into the Sangre de Cristo Mountains of the Colorado Rockies while they were returning from a performance in California. The Chapmans were reportedly en route to visit Sally's daughter (from a previous marriage) and new grandchild in Omaha, Nebraska at the time of the crash. Chapman was succeeded at Wanamaker's later that year by Peter Richard Conte.
