= Hewitt Quadrangle =

Plaza located at Yale University

Coordinates: 41.3115°N 72.9268°W

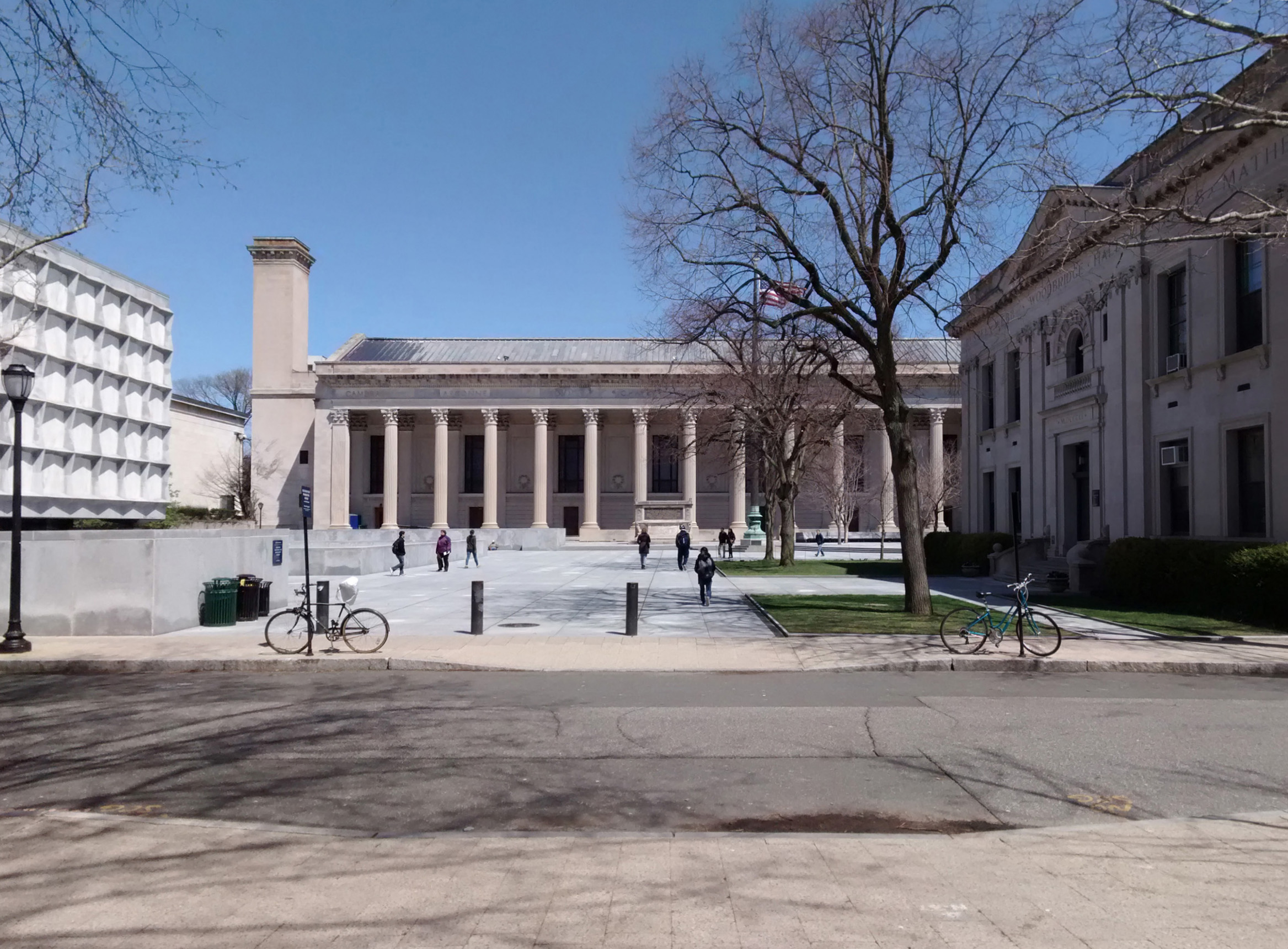
Commons and the Hewitt Quadrangle

Hewitt University Quadrangle, commonly known as Beinecke Plaza, is a plaza at the center of the Yale University campus in New Haven, Connecticut. It is the home of the university's administration, main auditorium, and dining facilities. The quadrangle was created with the construction of the university's Bicentennial Buildings and Woodbridge Hall in 1901. Until 1917, it was known as University Court. The completion of the Beinecke Library created subterranean library facilities beneath the courtyard, establishing the present appearance of the paved plaza and sunken courtyard.

== Buildings ==
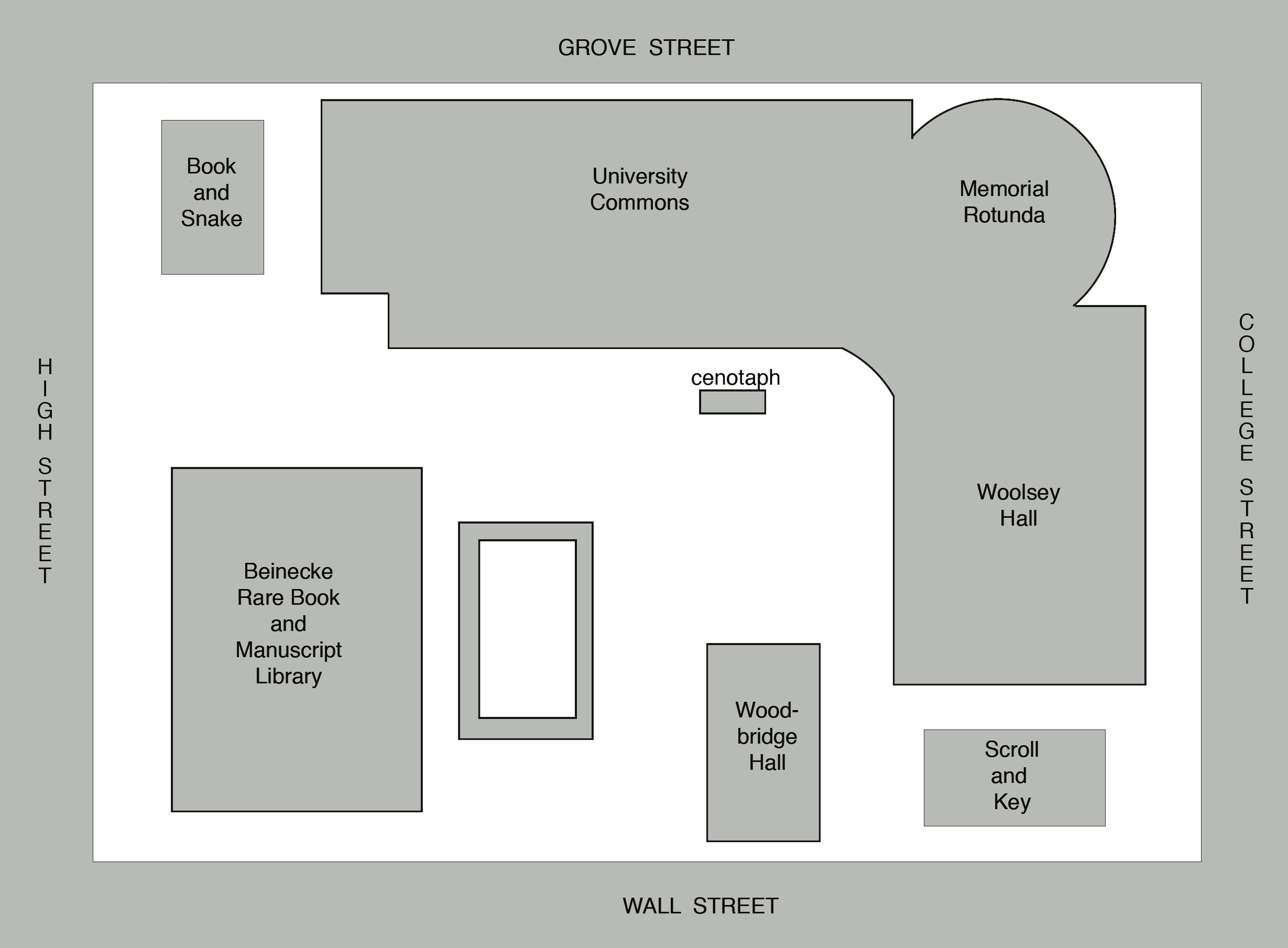
Figure-ground diagram of Hewitt Quadrangle

=== Bicentennial Buildings ===
Bicentennial Memorial Rotunda

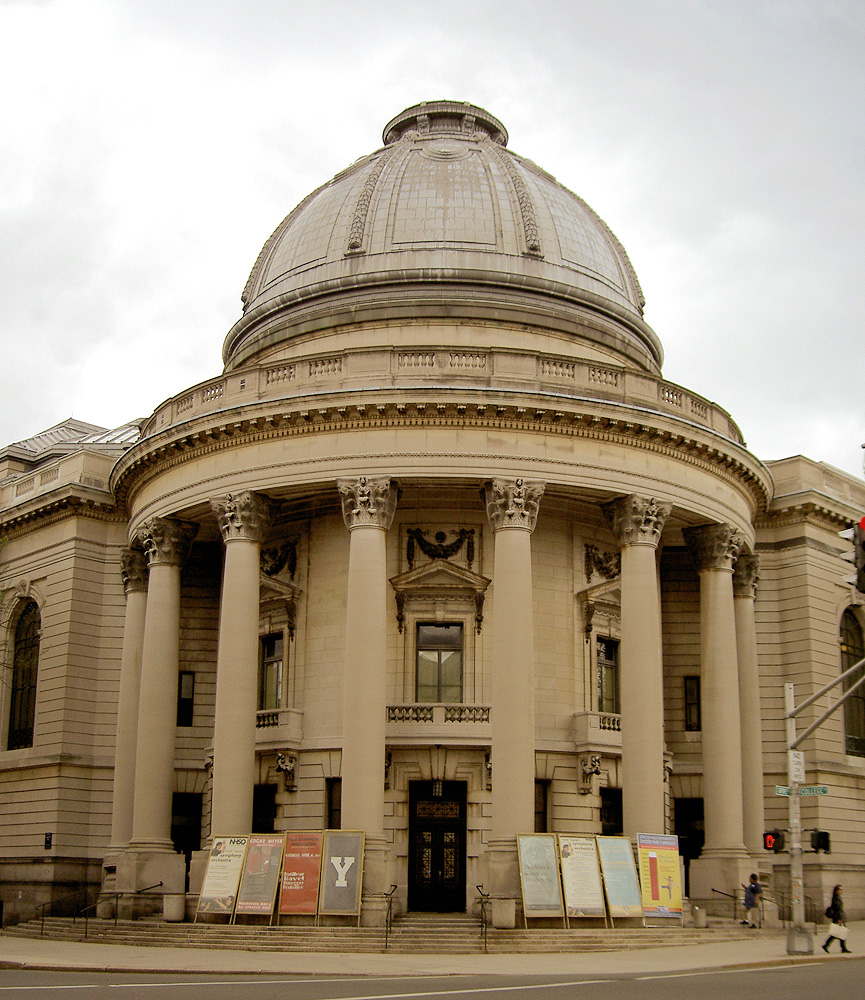
Exterior

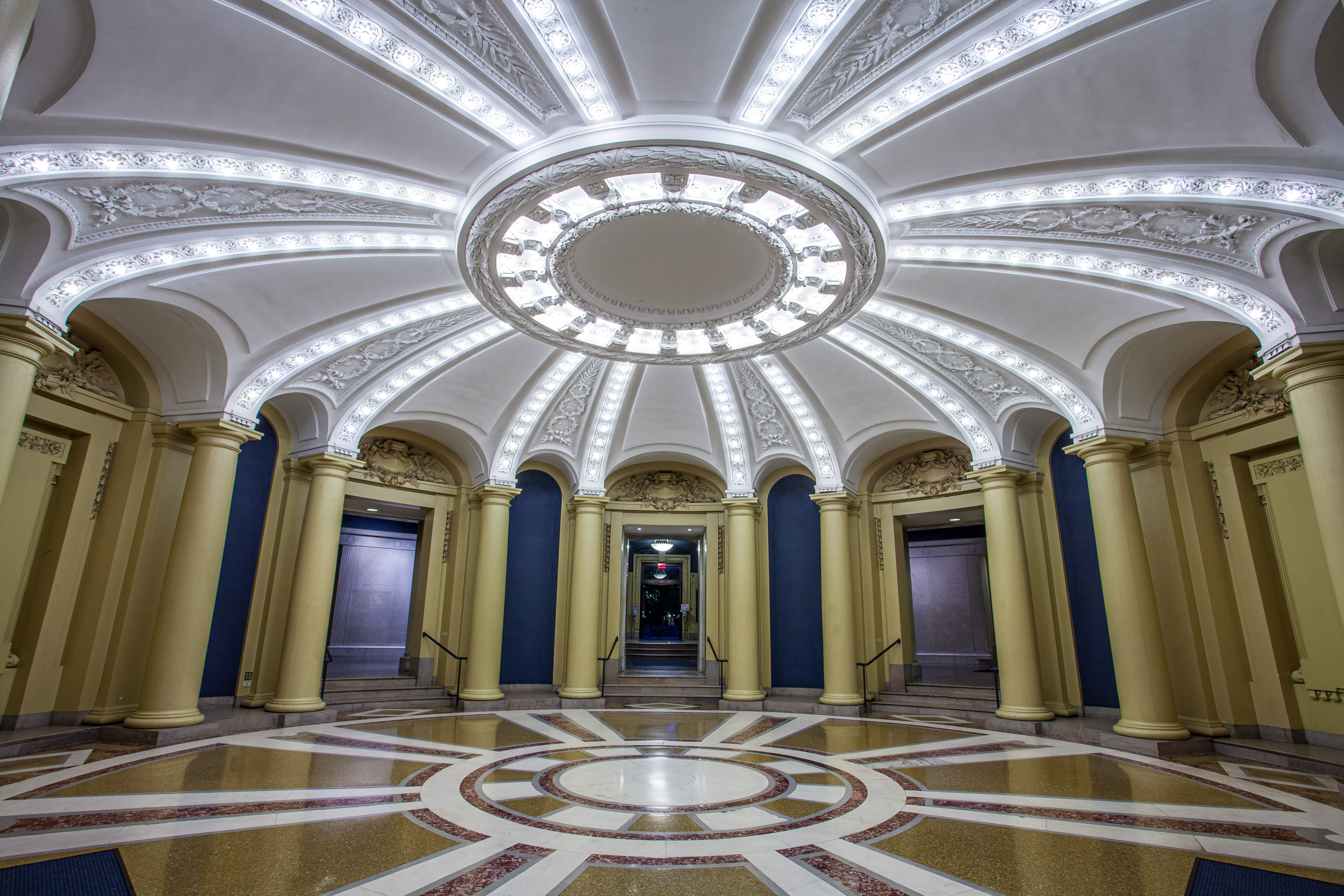
Interior

The Bicentennial Buildings–University Commons, the Memorial Rotunda, and Woolsey Hall–were the first buildings constructed for Yale University as opposed to one of its constituent entities (Yale College, Sheffield Scientific School, or others), reflecting a greater emphasis on central administration initiated by Presidents Timothy Dwight and Arthur Twining Hadley. Constructed in 1901-2 for the university's bicentennial, the limestone Beaux-Arts buildings linked the College buildings on the Old Campus with the Sheffield Scientific buildings on Hillhouse Avenue. They were designed by John M. Carrère and Thomas Hastings of Carrère and Hastings.

The University Commons, simply known as "Commons" on campus, is a timber-trussed banqueting hall. It served as the university-wide dining hall until the completion of the residential colleges, Sterling Law Building, and Hall of Graduate Studies in the 1930s.

Woolsey Hall was the university's first large secular assembly hall, with 2,691 seats. It holds one of the largest organs in the world: the Newberry Memorial Organ, a 1928 Skinner organ.

The Rotunda, with tablets on the walls commemorating Yale's war dead is a double-sized, domed, colonnaded version of Bramante's Tempietto built in 1502 on the site of St. Peter's martyrdom in Rome. Above the memorial is the President's Room, used for donor and ceremonial receptions.

=== Woodbridge Hall ===
Also completed in 1901, Woodbridge Hall is the main administrative building of the university. The Office of the President of the University has been stationed on the building's second floor since the administration of Arthur Twining Hadley. Adjacent is the Corporation Room, the boardroom of Yale's governing body. The building is named for Timothy Woodbridge, one of the ten founding ministers of the school, whose names of are engraved on the building's facade.

=== Beinecke Library ===
The visible portion of Beinecke Rare Book and Manuscript Library, on the east side of the plaza, designed by Gordon Bunshaft, is like the visible portion of an iceberg. With three underground levels extending under the plaza, most of the library is hidden.

== Sculpture ==
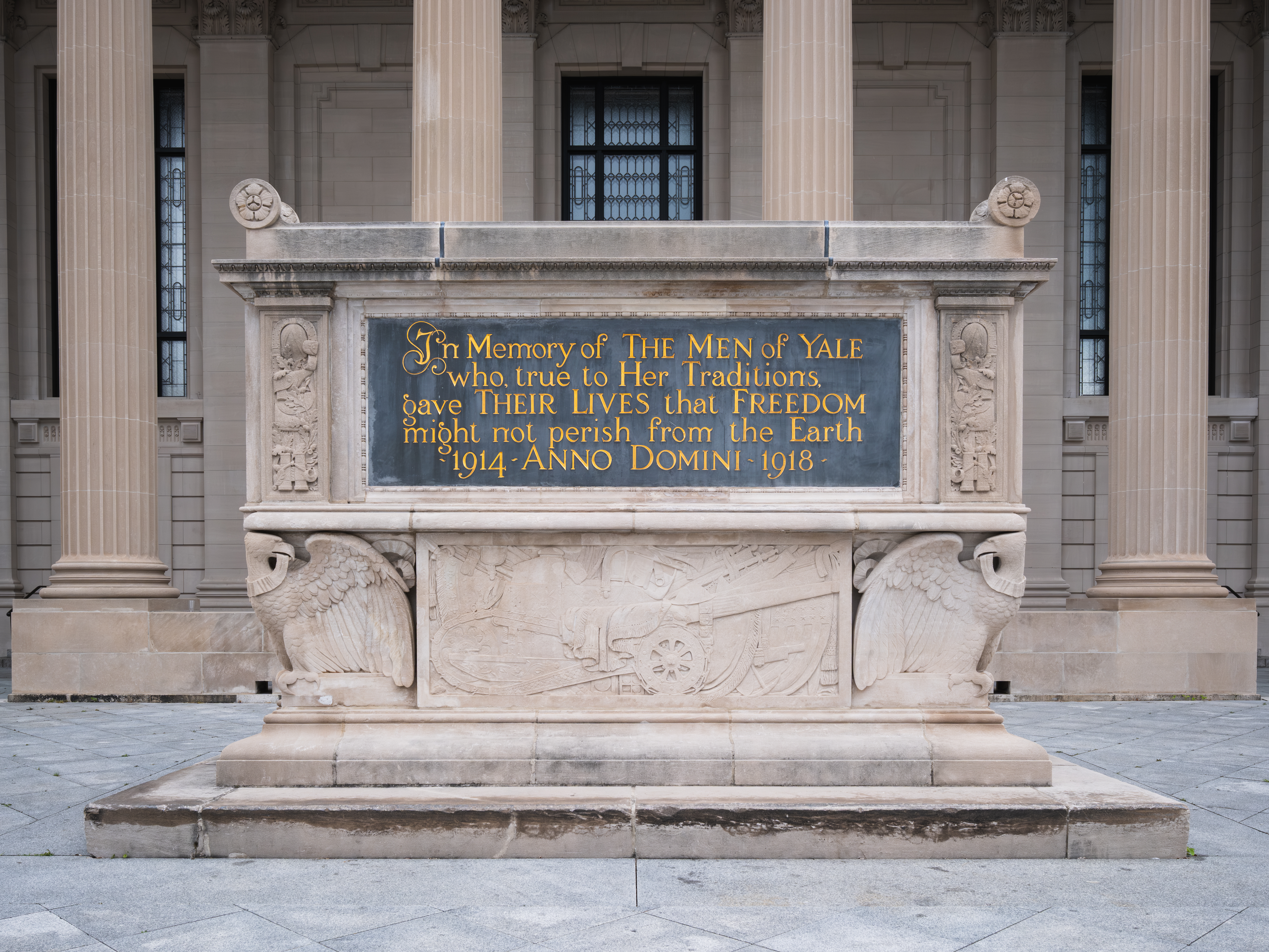
Yale University World War I Cenotaph

Before the colonnade of the Commons is a memorial cenotaph. Its inscription reads:

In Memory of the Men of Yale who true to Her Traditions gave their Lives that Freedom might not perish from the Earth. 1914 Anno Domini 1918.

Behind the cenotaph, one can see inscribed the names of World War I battles of Cambrai, Argonne, Somme, Chateau-Thierry, Ypres, St. Mihiel and Marne. Woodbridge Hall, located on the west side of the plaza, was designed by the firm of Howells & Stokes and is French Renaissance in style. It contains the central administration of the university. The building was named for Reverend Timothy Woodbridge, one of the founders of Yale College.

The Beinecke Library's sunken courtyard, visible but not accessible from the plaza, contains Isamu Noguchi's sculpture The Garden (Pyramid, Sun, and Cube). The three marble sculptures represent time, the sun, and chance. Alexander Calder's sculpture Gallows and Lollipops stands on the plaza. The Claes Oldenburg sculpture Lipstick (Ascending) on Caterpillar Tracks (now located in the Yale University Art Gallery Sculpture Garden) was once on the plaza.

== Use ==
As the symbolic heart of the university—and as the space in front of the administration building—Beinecke Plaza is occasionally the site of rallies and protests. These have included labor rallies held by the Federation of Hospital and University Employees and their supporters. Student protests have included a 16-day occupation of the plaza by Students Against Sweatshops in support of an ethical licensing policy (spring 2002). Most notable was the 1986 construction of a shanty-town erected to demand Yale's divestment from apartheid South Africa. After students erected the shanty-town, designed to mimic a Soweto shanty and named after Winnie Mandela, the university administration ordered its removal and demolished it. The destruction of the shanty-town, which required the arrest of dozens of protesters, unleashed an outpouring of anger and demands that the shanty-town be recreated. Eventually the university relented and the town was resurrected, only to be burned down by an irate alumnus two years later and replaced by a "memorial wall".

In April 2024, students under the moniker Occupy Beinecke maintained a weeklong daytime occupation and a weekend overnight encampment of the plaza, calling on Yale to divest its endowment from weapons manufacturers. The encampment was forcibly cleared by Yale and New Haven police after three days with 48 protesters arrested, but the protest was one of the first in a global wave of pro-Palestinian encampments on university campuses.
