= Richard Purvis =

American musician

Richard I. Purvis
- Purvis at Grace Cathedral
- Born: August 25, 1913; San Francisco, California, US
- Died: December 25, 1994 (aged 81); San Francisco, California, US
- Other name: Don Irving
- Known for: Grace Cathedral organist, composer

Richard (Irven) Purvis (August 25, 1913 – December 25, 1994) was an American organist, composer, conductor and teacher. He was best known for his expressive recordings of the organ classics and his own lighter compositions for the instrument.

== Early history ==
Richard Purvis was born in San Francisco on August 25, 1913. He began playing the organ publicly at the age of 14 in churches and in the Civic Auditorium in San Francisco. In addition to recitals and church services, Purvis played nightly recitals broadcast on the 7-rank style "E" Wurlitzer organ at the Chapel of the Chimes over local radio station KRE. His stage name was Don Irving and his theme song was 'I'll Take an Option on You'.

Leaving his native San Francisco to further his studies, he entered the Curtis Institute of Music in Philadelphia in January, 1936 under the Cyrus Curtis Organ Scholarship, which also paid for European summer study in 1936 and 1937. He was initially taught organ by Alexander McCurdy and conducting by Fritz Reiner. Further studies were with Josef Levine in New York, Dr. Charles M. Courboin in Baltimore, Dr. Edward Bairstow in England from whom he learned a great deal about the Anglican boy's choir, and Marcel Dupré in France.

== World War II service ==
In August, 1942 Purvis enlisted as a private in the United States Army. He was assigned to the Army War Show, playing the Hammond organ in the chaplain's exhibit. He rapidly advanced in the ranks. After attending the army music school in 1943 he attained the rank of warrant officer and was assigned to the 28th Infantry Division Band as bandmaster. Purvis's band was given the honor of being the first to march through Paris after its liberation.

Purvis was able to find time to compose while in the military. In 1942 he composed a setting of Joyce Kilmer's A Soldier's Prayer and Missa Sanctai Nicolai, both were premiered late that year at the Second Presbyterian Church in Philadelphia. His famous setting of "Greensleeves" and his "Seven Choral Preludes" were composed in a foxhole under enemy fire.

Purvis was captured in the Battle of the Bulge and held as a prisoner of war at Stalag 13B in Hammelburg, Bavaria. He was freed by advancing American forces after six months. Purvis was treated poorly in captivity. The buildings in the prison were extremely cold. Food was scarce. When Purvis was released he was unable to even play a chord and he required months of physical therapy at the Army Rehabilitation Center in Santa Barbara, California before he could resume his career.

== St. Mark Lutheran Church ==
After the war an appointment to St Mark's Lutheran Church took him back to his native city. The Schoenstein & Co. Organ at St. Mark had been built in 1895 and, during his brief tenure, Purvis was involved in the preparation for a new organ by M. P. Moller. Purvis played the dedication recital for the new instrument on May 6, 1947.

== Grace Cathedral ==
In February 1947 he was appointed to Grace Cathedral, San Francisco where he presided over the 4 manual, 93 rank Alexander Memorial Organ by Aeolian Skinner, one of the first American Classic instruments built by the firm. Affectionately known as 'Gussie', this organ was to profoundly influence his style of playing and composition. Purvis developed a distinctive 'Purvis sound' which was a result of the voicing of the organ and the regulation of tremulants, which he insisted be set full on in a style similar to theatre organs.

== Organist and composer ==
From 1947 through 1971, Purvis held the position of Organist and Master of Choristers at Grace Cathedral, where he helped to form a cathedral school for boys, ensuring the continuation of the all-male choir tradition. He was also organist at the California Palace of the Legion of Honor. Upon his retirement from Grace Cathedral, he continued to compose, teach and give recitals into his 70s. He died on December 25, 1994, at the age of 81. He left a legacy of over 200 works and an uncounted number of choristers, students and listeners.

Purvis's long and distinguished career was marked by elegant service playing, conducting and composition. He was admired as one of the finest organ improvisateurs in the U.S. In an era when romantic music was out of favor with most composers, and atonal, serial music was considered the hallmark of serious composition, he was not afraid to write tuneful, accessible, richly colored, and even whimsical compositions that possessed commercial viability. His more than 200 compositions include a Concerto for organ and orchestra; Four Prayers in Tone, Toccata Festiva & for organ; a partita on Christ ist Erstanden and The Ballad of Judas Iscariot for choir and orchestra. Perhaps his best-known and loved composition for the organ is the suite Four Dubious Conceits, comprising Cantilena, Les Petites Cloches, Nocturne, and Marche Grotesque, recorded by the composer for Sparton Records in the early 1960s; a more recent recording has been made by Keith Thompson on Organ Fireworks.

== Teacher ==
Purvis taught a number of prominent organists, among them Keith Chapman, Tom Hazleton, Ted Alan Worth, Donna Parker, Robert Tall, William C. Dickey, well-known theatre organists Christian Elliott,, Maria Kumagai, Candi Carley-Roth, international performer John West and James Welch who has written a comprehensive book on the life of Purvis.

== Archives ==
In 2012 associate Donna Parker donated Purvis's scores, documents, letters, recordings and other papers to the Archive of Recorded Sound at Stanford University.

== Sources ==
- Bach Cantatas.com
