= Paul W. Whear =

American composer (1925–2021)

Paul William Whear (November 13, 1925 – March 25, 2021) was an American composer, conductor, music educator, and double-bassist.

== Life and career ==
Whear (full name Paul William Whear) was born in Auburn, Indiana, and studied at Marquette University, the Catholic Jesuit University in Milwaukee where he received the B.N.S. After service as an officer in the U.S. Navy, he attended DePauw University School of Music in Greencastle, Indiana, where he received the Bachelor of Music and Master of Music, and Western Reserve University in Cleveland, Ohio, where he received the Ph.D. He received the Honorary Doctor of Fine Arts from Marquette University in 2002.

He taught theory and composition at Mount Union College in Alliance, Ohio, (1952–1960) as well as at Doane College in Crete, Nebraska, where he was chairman of the music department (1960–1969). He and his wife, violinist Nancy Robinson Voiers, played in the Lincoln Symphony during this time. Later he became a professor at Marshall University in Huntington, West Virginia, where he also was composer in residence and conductor of the Huntington Symphony Orchestra and the Huntington Chamber Orchestra. He retired as emeritus composer and conductor and received an honorary doctorate at Marquette University. He also taught theory, composition, and orchestration courses at the National Music Camp (now Interlochen Center for the Arts) in Interlochen, Michigan (1969–1988).

He appeared as a guest conductor in the United States, Canada, Japan, the Netherlands and the United Kingdom. As a composer he won many prizes and distinctions, including a grant from the National Endowment for the Arts, a Huntington Hartford Fellow residence, numerous ASCAP Awards, and numerous McDowell Artist Colony Fellowships. He is listed in Baker's Biographical Dictionary of Musicians, and was named "one of America's Top Ten Composers for Band In Fanfare Magazine (1963). For 60 years he conducted numerous band and orchestra clinics at the annual Midwest Musician Educators' Conference in Chicago. His musical epic, The Chief Justice, was performed live at the Kennedy Center for the Performing Arts in 1976 by the Marshal Department of Music. His works have been performed by leading orchestras, such as the London Symphony Orchestra, Philadelphia Orchestra, Cleveland Philharmonic, Cleveland Orchestra, Indianapolis Symphony, Rochester Civic Orchestra, Omaha Symphony, Lincoln Symphony, Charleston Symphony, the U.S. Navy Band, the U.S. Naval Academy Band, the U.S. Military Academy Band (West Point), and the Band of the Coldstream Guards, London.

Whear died on March 25, 2021, at the age of 95.

== Writings ==
- 1960. "Problems of the Small College Band". Music Educators Journal 46, no. 4 (Feb.–Mar.): 76–78.

== Compositions ==
=== Orchestra ===
- A Celtic Set, for string orchestra
- A Shakespeare Prelude, for orchestra
- An Appalachian Folk Tale, for speaker and orchestra 1980
- Catskill Legend 1963
- Catharsis Suite, for orchestra 1967
- Concertino, for string orchestra
  1. Overture
  2. Dirge
  3. Toccata
- Lancaster Overture 1963
- Decade Overture
- It's The Pizz
- Mallard Cove—Prelude and Rondo, for string orchestra
- Olympiad, for string orchestra
- Overture for strings, for string orchestra
- Pastorale Lament, for horn and string orchestra
- Prelude to the Ten Commandments, for orchestra
- Preludio, for string orchestra 1966- for the Vivaldi Orchestra of Manachester, U.K.
- Psalms of Celebration - Part I, for mixed choir, orchestra and brass
- Psalms of Celebration - Part II, for mixed choir, orchestra and brass
- Psalms of Celebration - Part III, for mixed choir, orchestra and brass
- Reflections, Scherzo for Strings, for string orchestra
- Seven
- Stars in a Field of Blue
- Symphony No. 2, "The Bridge" : In Memoriam RVW (2nd Movement)
- Symphony No. 3, " The Galleries", commissioned by the Huntington Art Museum
- The Chief Justice John Marshall, A Musical Epic for speaker, choir, and orchestra: commissioned by Marshall University
- Waltz, for strings
- White River Legend (Overture), commissioned by The Blue Lake Fine Arts Camp

=== Band ===
- 1958 Hartshorn, overture - Whear's first published work
- 1962 Jedermann, overture
- 1964 Contrapunctus
- 1964 Czech Suite
  1. Romantic Song
  2. Rippling Waters
  3. Festival Dance
- 1964 Kensington Overture
- 1966 Antietam
- 1968 Bellerophon, overture
- 1968 Land of Lincoln, concert march
- 1968 Decade Overture
- 1969 Wycliffe Variations
- 1970 Elsinore Overture
- 1971 Stonehenge Symphony - Symphony no. 1 for Purdue University Centennial
  1. Solstice
  2. Evocations
  3. Sacrifice
- 1972 Of This Time
- 1973 Lexington Overture
- 1979 Celebration XXV
- 1981 The Enterprise Overture
- 1982 Symphony No. 4: Commissioned by Harry Pfingsten, Avon Lake High School Band
  1. Overture
  2. Melodrama
  3. Finale
- A Lyric Suite
  1. Prelude
  2. Clog Dance
  3. Pastorale
  4. Procession
- An Appalachian set
- Canada—A Folksong Set for Band
- Catskill Legend
- The Chief Justice
- Defenders of the Blue: Parade March for the Strategic Air Command
- Down to the Sea in Ships - US Navy Band Commission
- Eternal Father
- Introduction and Invention
- Lincoln: 5th Symphony commissioned by the Library of Congress honoring Abraham Lincoln's 200th birthday
- Modal Miniatures -
- Proscenium Overture
- Quiet Music, based on Hans Leo Hassler’s Passion Chorale
- Sonata for Band
- Stars in a Field of Blue
- Yorktown, 1781
- Symphony 5: Lincoln commission by the Library of Congress in honor of Lincoln's 200th birthday

Ballet

- High Flight - based on John Gillespie Magee 's poem

Stage Work

- The Door, opera
- The Devil's Disciple - unfinished opera

=== Choir ===
- Old Gold—a Celebration, for mixed choir
- Crystals, for three-part women’s choir, three flutes, harp and percussion
- Mass for Today

=== Vocal music ===
- Sounds of Celebration, for baritone solo, mixed choir and band
- The Seasons, for baritone solo, mixed choir and orchestra
- Sonnets from Shakespeare, for baritone solo and chamber orchestra
- Gods Grandeur 1974 Commissioned by Jane Hobson for the Dedication of Pearl Buck's Birthplace

=== Chamber music ===
- 1975 Trio Variations, for cello, clarinet and piano
- A Separate Piece, for bassoon solo
- Invocation & Study, for brass quintet (1960)
- Five Haiku, for flute (or piccolo)
- March of the Viols, for contrabass and piano
- Prelude and Toccata, for trombone quartet
- Sonata "The Briefcase", for viola and piano
- Sonata, for cello solo (1979)
- Sonata, for trombone (or baritone) and piano (©1963)
- String Quartet No. 3 "The Phoenix"
- String Quartet: Four for Four
- Suite, for violin and cello (1984)
  1. Canon
  2. March
  3. Ostinato Aria
  4. Toccata
- The Viol Habit, for contrabass and piano
- Three Chorales, for brass quartet or brass ensemble
  1. Lass't uns erfreuen by Johann Christian Bach
  2. Chorale for Brasses by Carl Ludwig
  3. Freuet Euch Ihr Christen by Johann Sebastian Bach

=== Organ ===
- Music For Service With "Truro" (together with David Craighead)

This article translated from the Dutch Wikipedia
