= Ernest M. Skinner =

American organ builder (1866–1960)

Ernest Martin Skinner
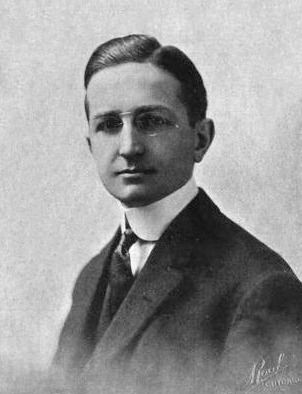
- Skinner in 1914
- Born: Ernest Martin Skinner; January 15, 1866; Clarion, Pennsylvania, U.S.
- Died: November 26, 1960 (aged 94); Dorchester, Boston, Massachusetts, U.S.
- Known for: Pipe organ builder

Ernest Martin Skinner (January 15, 1866 – November 26 or November 27, 1960) was an American pipe organ builder whose innovations in electro-pneumatic switching systems are credited with significantly influencing organ-building technology in the early 20th century.

== Life and career ==
Skinner was born in Clarion, Pennsylvania to touring concert singers Washington and Alice Skinner. His father organized a music company in Taunton, Massachusetts and sang in a quartet at Taunton's Unitarian Church. It was at this church that Skinner encountered his first organ and experienced live music for the first time, during a performance of Gilbert and Sullivan songs. He got a job as a bellows pumper at Taunton's Baptist church for fifteen cents per hour, where he first gained experience repairing and constructing organs.

When he was a teenager, the family moved to West Somerville, Massachusetts, where he attended high school for six months. In his autobiography, he stated that his leaving school was due to his inability to understand Latin. However, Dorothy Holden writes in her biography "The Life and Work of Ernest M. Skinner", that the family's fortunes had declined and Skinner had to help support them.

Skinner became a "shop boy" for George H. Ryder, a small organ builder in Reading, Massachusetts. He was fired after four years, which led to his employment at the shop of a prominent Boston organ builder, George Hutchings, following Ryder's foreman Horace Marden, and voicer William H. Dolbeer. He began at Hutchings' shop working as a tuner. After twelve years at the firm, Skinner climbed to the position of factory superintendent.

In 1893 in Bethel, Maine, he married Bethel native Mabel Hastings.

The 1897 Hutchings organ at the Basilica and Shrine of Our Lady of Perpetual Help in Boston drew national attention for Hutchings, though he did not credit Ernest Skinner for its success.

Skinner made the first of two publicly known trips to England, crossing the Atlantic on a cattle steamer, in 1898. There, Skinner was introduced to the work of Henry Willis, the London builder whose high-pressure chorus reeds and tuba 'organ stop' set the benchmark for much of the 20th century. Skinner was given access to the large organ at St George's Hall, Liverpool, and met privately with Willis who tutored him in voicing practices and techniques not yet known in the United States.

Skinner then visited France where he met Louis Vierne, the blind organist at Notre Dame in Paris. Upon his return to Boston, Skinner made his first pedal trombone stop modeled after the work of Willis for the 1900 Hutchings organ at Boston Music Hall. The first documented instance of the Pitman windchest, as developed by Skinner, appeared in the 1899 Hutchings-Votey organ installed at the Flatbush Reformed Dutch Church in Brooklyn, New York. However, some sources mention origins in Hutchings's organs as early as 1893.

In 1901, Skinner decided to strike out on his own. In 1902, he became a partner of another former Hutchings-Votey employee to form the Skinner & Cole Company. By 1904 their partnership had dissolved, and Ernest M. Skinner & Company purchased the Skinner and Cole assets.

=== Organ development and design ===
Skinner was one of the first organ builders to try establishing a systematic method for providing fixed dimensions in his organ consoles. Before this, each organ builder might have used different dimensions on their consoles, causing problems with users adapting to various layouts and positions of keyboards and pedal boards for instruments, even those made by the same builder. Skinner worked to develop a set of universal distances between the various keyboards, determining the ideal placement of the pedal board at a specific distance from the Great Manual, as well as the placement of expression shoes and other mechanical devices. These advancements significantly contributed to the standard American Guild of Organists (AGO) Console Measurements in use in the United States since 1930.

Skinner consoles had fully adjustable combination pistons and combination actions decades before other American firms adopted similar devices. Access to pre-sets, used to store and recall combination controls on Skinner instruments, was located on numbered rows of buttons between the keyboards.

Skinner is credited with the development of electro-pneumatic action, which controls the mechanical operation of the instruments. These massive (frequently several-ton) and highly sophisticated devices were built of wood, leather, and metal organ parts. They used low-voltage DC and low-pressure pressurized air to control and direct the switching and control commands. These actions allowed the instrument's pipework to be located in any part of a building. The console could be located hundreds of feet away allowing a single organist to control every aspect of the instrument.

Skinner developed numerous automatic playing mechanisms that enabled unskilled individuals to operate a large pipe organ like a player piano. In 1915, Skinner filed a patent for an "Automatic Musical Instrument", granted in 1916. The following year, 1917, Skinner completed a player organ dubbed, "The Orchestrator." This was a lifelong interest of Skinner, which he frequently worked in secret. The Toledo Museum of Art contains a fully restored Skinner instrument that uses a player action, Opus 603.

The first of Skinner's new stops, the Erzähler, appeared in 1904 and was soon joined by other tonal colors which Skinner worked on between 1908 and 1924, including flügelhorn and heckelphone stop. In addition to his orchestral color reeds, Skinner developed numerous string and hybrid flue stops, many with matching celestes. Among these were the Salicional/Voix Celeste and Dulciana/Unda Maris present in the Swell and Choir divisions of many American organs of the era, as well as his Flauto Dolce/Flute Celeste, his Dulcet (a pair of very narrow scaled string ranks tuned with a fast beat to heighten the intensity), a pair of inverted-flare gambas found in the solo divisions of many of his larger organs that allowed a rich, cello-like timbre for solo lines in the tenor range, the Kleine Erzähler, a softer, brighter version of his earlier Erzähler (which mimics the effect of string players playing very softly), as well as Pedal Violone stops at 32' and 16' pitches, which he defined as "subtle, soft string stops". Skinner is known for his imitative French horn stop, which is the only one of his sonic creations that he patented.

His earliest designs built in his workshop in South Boston were for George Foster Peabody and the Great Hall of City College in New York.

Ernest M. Skinner & Company built large organs for Old South Church in Boston, Cathedral of St. John the Divine (op. 150, 1906); Saint Luke's Episcopal Church, Evanston, Illinois (op. 327, 1922); Sage Chapel at Cornell University (op. 175, 1909); Carnegie Music Hall, Pittsburgh (op. 180, 1910); Appleton Chapel, Harvard (op. 197, 1912); Saint Thomas Episcopal Church, New York (op. 205, 1913); Finney Chapel, Oberlin College (op. 230, 1914), Kirkpatrick Chapel at Rutgers College (Op. 255, 1916), and the Brick Presbyterian Church, New York (op. 280, 1917).

In 1919, Ernest M. Skinner & Company was reorganized with Arthur H. Marks (the former general manager and vice-president of the Goodrich Rubber Company) as the president and Skinner vice-president of the newly organized Skinner Organ Company. This allowed Skinner to focus on technical and artistic aspects, while others managed the commercial aspects of the company. In 1924, at the behest of Marks and William Zeuch, another principal at the factory, Skinner made his second trip to England, this time meeting with Henry Willis III, the grandson of Henry Willis, and spending time in France with Marcel Dupré learning about mutation stops and chorus work of the French Romantic organ.

=== Declining success and sale of the Skinner Organ Company ===
The Skinner Organ Company built hundreds of pipe organs for customers all across the United States. The relationship between Skinner and the business managers of his company was rarely good, but by 1927 friction had built between Marks and Skinner. At the suggestion of English organ builder Henry Willis III, George Donald Harrison joined the Skinner staff as assistant general manager in 1927. Initially, Skinner viewed this arrangement positively, and collaborations between Skinner and Harrison resulted in four Landmark Organs in the late 1920s. The first was built in 1928 for the University of Michigan at Ann Arbor, then two additional large organs, one for the Chapel at Princeton University, then another for Rockefeller Memorial Chapel at the University of Chicago. The final instrument was the rebuilding and expansion of the Newberry Memorial Organ, which is located in Woolsey Hall at Yale University. The Woolsey Hall organ is the biggest instrument to bear the Skinner nameplate and remains virtually unaltered. It is widely considered to be one of the finest "symphonic organs" in the world.

With the onset of the Great Depression and coincident improvements in the recording and playback of electronically amplified music in larger public spaces, orders for pipe organs fell. The Skinner Company was forced to lay off workers and scale back production. The world of organ music and performance in the early 1930s had also begun to change. The orchestral style of instrument, which was the Skinner Company's speciality, had been falling from favor among younger organists; many were looking for a more classical organ sound. Harrison, who had been working on this new tonal direction for the company, was becoming more frequently requested as the designer and finisher of the limited number of available projects and Skinner found himself being requested less. Many organists did maintain personal loyalty to Skinner and insisted on his involvement.

The 1932 merger of the Aeolian Organ Company with the Skinner Company and the resulting change of the company name to Aeolian-Skinner, resulted in increasing tension between Skinner, Harrison, and Marks, as Skinner saw his technical and artistic influence diminishing with the ascension of Harrison.

On July 14, 1933, Skinner was formally stripped of his titles and authority within the company by the Board of Directors of the Aeolian-Skinner Company, following his attempts to circumvent Harrison and influence the contract terms for the organ at Grace Cathedral in San Francisco.

The final instrument, which was personally designed and finished by Skinner, though built by the Aeolian-Skinner factory, is the large organ at the Chapel of Girard College in Philadelphia (Opus 872 - 1933). It is installed in a spacious and highly resonant dedicated chamber, located above the ceiling, and 100 feet (30 m) above the floor of the 2,000+ seat chapel. Speaking down through a large ceiling grill and into the resonant acoustics of the chapel, even the softest voices of the instrument are heard throughout the room.

As pressure increased within the Aeolian-Skinner Company, Skinner began to plan the formation of a new organ company with his son, Richmond Hastings Skinner, which he planned to call the Ernest M. Skinner and Son Organ Company, to compete with the Aeolian-Skinner Company. Marks was able to persuade Skinner (with the help of Skinner's wife Mabel and his son Richmond) to instead enter into a five-year contract with the Skinner Organ Company that provided Skinner with an annual salary of $5,000 in exchange for the continued use of his name, but required that Mr. Skinner and his newly purchased interest in the Methuen Organ Company would not compete with Aeolian-Skinner in the construction of new organs, but rather "confine his work..." in the Methuen shop "...to the rebuilding of older pipe organs".

In January 1936, Skinner sold his interest in the Skinner Organ Company to purchase the property now known as Methuen Memorial Music Hall in Methuen, Massachusetts, including the adjacent organ factory. Both had been built by Edward Francis Searles to house and maintain the gigantic organ built for the Boston Music Hall in 1863. In the following years, Skinner presented public performances of choral and organ works with featured performers including Marcel Dupré and E. Power Biggs.

=== Later years ===
In 1936, Skinner, and his son Richmond Hastings Skinner, were awarded the contract for his final instrument, the Washington National Cathedral. The instrument was dedicated in the fall of 1938, to wide national acclaim.

World War II and the resulting materials shortages and related financial troubles forced the company to file for bankruptcy on October 1, 1941. The Methuen Organ Shop burned to the ground on June 17, 1943; the adjacent Music Hall and its organ were saved.

In January 1947, Skinner joined the Schantz Organ Company in Orrville, Ohio.

In 1949, then in his eighties and almost completely deaf, Skinner retired from organ building. Afterwards, he began writing the book The Composition of the Organ, which was unfinished by his death but completed and published by his son in 1980.

Skinner was always a prolific writer, with his letters penned to the editors of The Diapason and The American Organist appearing in those publications from the 1940s onward, wherein he worked to defend his tonal ideals and attempted to regain lost territory on the American musical landscape. As early as the mid-1930s, Skinner saw many of his instruments rebuilt or modified beyond recognition, while others were removed and thrown out wholesale, in the name of "musical progress." Even three of the "Landmark Organs" mentioned in the previous section were subject to this trend, with modifications to the University of Chicago organ being carried out only a few years after its completion.

Not every organist felt obliged to follow the dictates of the "organ reform movement" and any discussion of Skinner would be incomplete without mentioning his extensive, informative, and influential writings on the organ and its music, published in books and national journals over most of his career.

Following the death of his wife Mabel in 1951, Skinner entered a downward spiral from which he never recovered. The tonal revision of his earlier organs at St. John the Divine (op. 150, 1911), St. Thomas (op. 205, 1913), and his final large organ built for the Washington National Cathedral all were subject to this trend by the mid-1950s, further complicating his emotional state as he saw his life's work and ideals gradually becoming extinct. In recent decades, however, there has been a resurgence of interest in restoring Skinner's instruments to their original condition. In many cases in which Skinner's pipework was replaced with more generic or baroque sounds, the original pipework was preserved in storage, thus making it easier for the eventual rebuilding and restoration of his instruments to their original tonal designs and sound.

In 1956, he was living in Dorchester, Massachusetts. The final years of Skinner's life saw him living in relative obscurity in California.

Skinner died during the night of November 26–27, 1960, at the age of 94, at the family home. He is buried in Bethel, Maine, in his wife's family plot.

== List of important E. M. Skinner organs ==
- Old Cabell Hall, University of Virginia. Charlottesville, VA. 1906, Opus 127. (oldest surviving E.M. Skinner Organ in original condition)
- Trinity Cathedral (Episcopal) Cleveland, OH. 1907, Opus 140. Removed in 1997, pipework was dispersed to several builders. New instrument created in 2021 by the Muller Pipe Organ Company, combining Aeolian-Skinner Opus 1188 (built for St. Paul's Episcopal Church, Richmond VA) and Skinner Opus 245 (built for Church of the Transfiguration, Cleveland OH)
- Harvard Divinity School, Andover Chapel, Cambridge, MA. 1911, Opus 184
- Williams College, Grace Hall, Williamstown, MA. 1911, Opus 195. The remaining pipework moved to Dunwoody United Methodist Church in Dunwoody, GA in 2019 and combined with another instrument
- St. Thomas Episcopal Church, New York City (Manhattan) 1913, Opus 205. Rebuilt by Aeolian-Skinner in 1955, replaced by a new instrument (Dobson) in 2018
- Oberlin College, Finney Chapel, Oberlin OH. 1921, Opus 230. Rebuilt by Aeolian-Skinner in 1955, replaced by a new instrument (Fisk) in 2001
- Church of our Father, Universalist (today: First Unitarian Universalist Church) Detroit, MI. 1925, Opus 232
- Municipal Auditorium, Portland, OR. 1916, Opus 265. Moved to Alpenrose Dairy Opera House, Portland, OR in 1971
- Grove Park Inn Hotel, Asheville, NC. 1919, Opus 295. Moved to First Presbyterian Church, Baltimore, MD in 1929, destroyed 1961
- Civic Auditorium, St. Paul, MN. 1921, Opus 308. Moved to Old South Church, Boston, MA in 1985.
- Second Congregational Church (today: The United Congregational Church), Holyoke, MA. 1920, Opus 322
- St. Luke's Episcopal Church, Evanston, IL. 1922 Opus 327
- Public Auditorium, Cleveland, OH. 1922 Opus 328
- Cleveland Museum of Art, Garden Court, Cleveland, OH. 1922 Opus 333. Rebuilt by Holtkamp in 1933 and 1946, and moved to the Museum's new Gartner Auditorium in 1971
- Trinity Church Wall Street, New York City (Manhattan). 1923, Opus 408. Rebuilt by Aeolian-Skinner in 1970, removed in 2003, will be replaced by a new instrument (Glatter-Götz/Rosales) in 2023.
- St. John's Episcopal Cathedral Los Angeles, CA. 1924, Opus 446
- California Palace of the Legion of Honor, San Francisco, CA. 1924, Opus 455
- Jefferson Avenue Presbyterian Church, Detroit, MI. 1924, Opus 475.
- Trinity Episcopal Church, San Francisco CA. 1924, Opus 477.
- Hollywood High School, Los Angeles, CA. 1924, Opus 481
- Temple Emanu-El, San Francisco, CA. 1924, Opus 497
- University Auditorium, University of Florida, Gainesville, FL. 1924, Opus 501. Rebuilt by Aeolian-Skinner in 1965 and by Möller in 1980 and 1992
- St. Ann's and the Holy Trinity Church, New York City (Brooklyn). 1925, Opus 524
- Detroit Masonic Temple, Scottish Rite Cathedral (today: Cathedral Theatre) Detroit, MI. 1925, Opus 529
- Trinity Episcopal Church, Gallery Organ, Boston, MA 1926, Opus 574
- Stambaugh Auditorium, Youngstown, OH. 1926, Opus 582
- Toledo Museum of Art, Toledo, OH. 1926, Opus 603
- Rockefeller Chapel, University of Chicago, Chicago, IL. 1927, Opus 634
- Masonic Temple, Dayton, OH. 1926, Opus 624
- St. Bartholomew's Episcopal Church, New York City (Manhattan). 1927, Opus 651. Used pipework from the previous church building, expanded in 1927 and 1930, rebuilt by Aeolian-Skinner in 1937 (West Gallery) and 1953 (Chancel)
- Immanuel Presbyterian Church, Los Angeles, CA. 1927, Opus 676
- Woolsey Hall, Yale University, New Haven, CT. 1928, Opus 722. Made extensive use of pipework from the preceding Hutchings-Votey Organ (1902)
- Our Lady, Queen of the Most Holy Rosary Cathedral, Toledo, OH. 1930, Opus 820
- Church of the Immaculate Conception, Philadelphia, PA. 1927, Opus 660. Removed in 1987 and relocated to Cincinnati Museum Center at Union Terminal
- Dayton Art Institute, Dayton, OH. 1929, Opus 749
- Old First Presbyterian Church, Columbus, OH. 1929, Opus 773
- Severance Hall, Cleveland, OH. 1929, Opus 816
- First Presbyterian Church, Passaic, NJ. 1930; transferred in 2013 to Saalkirche in Ingelheim, Germany, Opus 823
- St. Peter's Episcopal Church, Morristown, NJ. 1930, Opus 836
- Brown Memorial Presbyterian Church, Baltimore, MD. 1930, Opus 839
- First Congregational Church, Los Angeles, CA. 1931, Opus 856.
- Girard College Chapel, Philadelphia, PA. 1931, Opus 872
- Washington National Cathedral, Washington, DC. 1938, Opus 510 (built by the E. M. Skinner & Son firm, this instrument replaced the two-manual Aeolian-Skinner Opus 883 from 1932. Rebuilt by Aeolian-Skinner in 1957, 1962, and 1964, further rebuilding by other firms in 1975 and 1988)
- Calvary Presbyterian Church, Newburgh, NY. 1937, Opus 512 (built by the E. M. Skinner & Son firm. This instrument was removed, completely restored, and reinstalled by Foley Baker, Inc. in 2023.) The organ and its restoration was featured as the cover article of The American Organist, February 2023 issue.
