= Symphonic organ =

Kind of organ

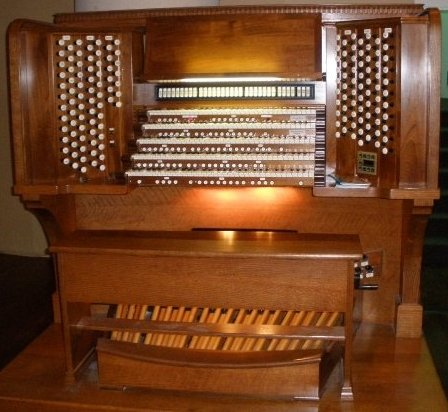
The console of the Royce Hall pipe organ at UCLA; built by Skinner in 1930, it is an excellent example of the Symphonic Organ.

Dukas: The Sorcerer's Apprentice (excerpt)
Organ transcription by Josh Perschbacher

The symphonic organ is a style of pipe organ that flourished during the first three decades of the 20th century in town halls and other secular public venues, particularly in the United States and the United Kingdom. It has roots in 19th-century Europe, and is a variation of the classical pipe organ. It features expanded capabilities, with many pipes imitative of orchestral instruments (e.g., strings, woodwinds, brass), and with multiple expressive divisions and organ console controls for seamlessly adjusting volume and tone, generally with electric organ actions and winding. These expansions let the organist approximate a conductor's power to shape the tonal textures of Romantic music and orchestral transcriptions. (These are classical orchestral works re-scored for a solo organist, a practice particularly popular before technology allowed orchestras to be widely recorded and broadcast.) These organs are generally concert instruments as opposed to church organs. The symphonic organ has seen a revival in the US, Europe and Japan, particularly since the 1980s.

The leading builders of symphonic organs were Henry Willis & Sons in the UK and Ernest M. Skinner in the US, following the pioneering 19th-century work of Eberhard Friedrich Walcker in Germany and Aristide Cavaillé-Coll in France, and inspiring the organ music of such figures as Edward Elgar, Edwin Lemare, Franz Liszt, and César Franck, respectively. The largest example is the Wanamaker Organ, designed by George Ashdown Audsley for the 1904 St. Louis World's Fair, re-installed in a Philadelphia department store in 1911, and then greatly expanded over two decades. It currently has six manuals, eleven divisions, 464 ranks, and 28,750 pipes, all powered by 36 regulators and fans totaling 173 hp. Other important examples around Philadelphia are the Skinner organ at Girard College Chapel (1931), the Curtis Organ at Irvine Auditorium (University of Pennsylvania, 1926), and the Aeolian Company organ at nearby Longwood Gardens (1929). In New Haven, Connecticut, three organbuilders assembled one of the world's largest and finest symphonic organs for Yale University in Woolsey Hall (Newberry Memorial Organ, 1902/1915/1928).

Another excellent example of a symphonic organ can be seen and heard at the Soldiers and Sailors Memorial Auditorium in Chattanooga, Tennessee. The magnificent Opus 1206 by Austin Organs, with 81 ranks and 5,261 pipes, was first played on February 12, 1925. Its first Civic Organist was the world-renowned Edwin Lemare. Led by the Chattanooga Music Club, the citizens of Chattanooga began the organ's restoration in 1987, and 20 years later, on July 2, 2007, it was re-dedicated at a concert performed by Wanamaker organist Peter Richard Conte. Municipal symphonic organs are still in prominent use in San Diego, California (Spreckels Organ Pavilion, 1914) and in Portland, Maine (Kotzschmar Memorial Organ, 1912), and in 1999 a large 1920s-vintage Skinner organ was inaugurated in the Cincinnati Museum Center at Union Terminal.
