= G. Donald Harrison =

Pipe organ builder (1889–1956)

George Donald Harrison (G. Donald Harrison) (April 21, 1889 – June 14, 1956) was responsible for the design of some of the finest and largest pipe organs in the United States. Born in Huddersfield, England, he first worked as a patent attorney in 1914 but after military service he began to pursue an interest in pipe organ building, working with Henry Willis & Sons of London.

After immigrating to America, Harrison joined the Skinner Organ Company in 1927 where he spent the remainder of his career. After the Skinner company merged with the Aeolian Organ Company, forming the Aeolian-Skinner Organ Company in 1933, he became the company's tonal director and president. While the bulk of his work was as a tonal designer and voicer, Harrison is most famous for his association with "American Classic" organ design. This design concept (its name coined by New Jersey state senator and fellow organ builder Emerson Lewis Richards) was partly a reaction to the proliferation of romantic-orchestral "symphonic organs" that had been in fashion to that point. The symphonic organ sought to emulate the effects of a symphony orchestra with imitative solo reeds, colorful flutes and warm string-toned stops. While these organs were well-suited to orchestral transcriptions, they lacked the clarity and brilliance needed to accurately play polyphonic music from the 18th century and earlier. On the other hand, the American Classic design sought to return to design principles of the 18th century, particularly the development of clean diapason choruses topped by brilliant mixtures. The voicing of these instruments allowed for a clear interpretation of fugal passages and chorale writing where each inner voice could be heard and articulated clearly.

However, American Classic organs also contained symphonic stops and expressive divisions akin to those found on Romantic organs, with a special emphasis placed on voices from the 19th- and early 20th-century French Romantic schools. By using this method of blending different organ stops from all eras of organ building, Harrison conceived the American Classic organ as a single instrument that could effectively and convincingly play music of all styles and eras with equal facility. In many of his instruments, he is considered to have achieved this goal, adapting his instruments effectively to the particular acoustic qualities of American concert halls and churches.

Harrison’s design concept was illustrated when he wrote: “To me, all art is international; one can draw from the best of all countries. I have used the technique at my disposal to produce instruments which I consider suitable for expressing the best in organ literature. I have no use for copying successful works of the past; such a method is doomed to failure. It seems to me the only way to build artistic and successful instruments is to have knowledge of what has gone before, and to thoroughly understand the underlying principles upon which the great works of the past have been based. The works produced are then originals, and while they can possess all the advantages of other good work, they have their own personality and reflect their own good time.”

The pipe organs at Grace Cathedral in San Francisco, Church of the Advent in Boston, and at St. John’s Chapel in Groton, Massachusetts, are often as cited as the first transitional instruments produced under Harrison’s direction. Each featured Baroque-style stops on low wind pressure with several different high-pitched mixtures, departing from contemporary American organ-building standards. These designs influenced a shift in the market, increasing demand for Aeolian-Skinner instruments, prompting other builders to adapt their product to the changing styles.

A heavy smoker, Harrison died of a heart attack after weeks of overworking himself during hot summer months for the rebuilding of the E.M. Skinner organ at Saint Thomas Church Fifth Avenue for the 1956 American Guild of Organists national convention in New York City. Ernest M. Skinner, although much older, outlived Harrison by four years.

Aeolian-Skinner pipe organs built under Harrison's direction are considered by many to be the apotheosis of the American organ builder's art for their period. Unfortunately many of Harrison's masterworks have been altered, rebuilt or modified in such a way as to no longer be representative of his aesthetic.

- Northrop Auditorium, University of Minnesota (1932-1935)
- Grace Cathedral, San Francisco (1934) G. Donald Harrison signature organ.
- St. Mark's Episcopal Church, Locust Street, Philadelphia (1937)
- St. Bartholomew's Church, New York City (1937) Gallery organ.
- Sage Chapel, Cornell University, Ithaca, New York (1940)
- Church of St. Mary the Virgin, New York City (1941)
- Methuen Memorial Music Hall, Massachusetts (1947) G. Donald Harrison signature organ.
- The Riverside Church, New York City (1947)
- The Mormon Tabernacle, Salt Lake City (1948) G. Donald Harrison signature organ.
- Symphony Hall, Boston (1949) G. Donald Harrison signature organ
- First Church of Christ, Scientist, Boston (1952)
- Annie Merner Chapel at MacMurray College, Jacksonville, Illinois (1952)
- Cathedral of St. John the Divine, New York City (1953) G. Donald Harrison signature organ
- Princeton University Chapel (1954)
- Byrnes Auditorium, Winthrop University, Rock Hill, South Carolina (1955) G. Donald Harrison signature organ.
- Hill Auditorium, University of Michigan (1955)
- St. Thomas Church, Fifth Avenue, New York City (1956) G. Donald Harrison died during restoration of this organ for the NYC AGO conference.
- First Presbyterian Church, Kilgore, Texas (1949) G. Donald Harrison signature organ. One of many that were voiced by Roy Perry in East Texas, and Shreveport, Louisiana. This organ is part of the East Texas Pipe Organ Festival.
- Druid Hills Presbyterian Church, Atlanta, Georgia (1940)
- Fullerton Auditorium, Limestone University, Gaffney, South Carolina (1946)

== Bibliography ==
- Bush, Douglas E. (2006). The Organ: An Encyclopedia. London: Routledge.
- Callahan, Charles (1990). The American Classic Organ: A History in Letters. Richmond: The Organ Historical Society.
- Downward, Brock. W. (1976). G. Donald Harrison and the American Classic Organ. PhD. dissertation. University of Rochester.
- Ellinwood, Leonard (1953). "English Influences in American Church Music." Proceedings of the Royal Musical Association 80.
- Ochsa, Orphe (1975). The History of the Organ in the United States. Bloomington: Indiana University Press.
