= Joan Lippincott =

American concert organist (1935–2025)

Joan Lippincott

Joan Lippincott (December 25, 1935 – May 31, 2025) was an American concert organist and head of the organ department at Westminster Choir College in Princeton, New Jersey.

== Life and career ==
Lippincott was born Joan Edna Hult on December 25, 1935, the daughter of Edna and Frank Hult, in Kearny, New Jersey. Her early keyboard studies were with William Jancovius of Nutley, New Jersey. After attending Kearny High School, she entered Westminster Choir College, where she studied with the renowned Alexander McCurdy. Upon graduation from Westminster, she gained entrance to the Curtis Institute of Music in Philadelphia, where she was again the student of McCurdy as well as Vladimir Sokoloff. Following her Diploma from the Curtis Institute, she returned to Westminster Choir College to earn her master's degree. At the same time, McCurdy hired her to join the Westminster keyboard faculty, starting what would become her 37-year tenure there.

On June 18, 1960, she married Curtis Lippincott in Bristol Chapel on the Westminster campus. At the age of 31 in 1967, she became the head of the Organ Department at Westminster Choir College, the largest organ department in the world at the time, where she would teach hundreds of student organists over the years. In 1993 she accepted a position as the Principal Organist at Princeton University Chapel, with its freshly rebuilt instrument, while retaining her position at Westminster. Soon after, she realized that the demands of the Princeton position made it impossible for her to remain the head of the Westminster Organ Department. From 1993 until 2000, she served as the Princeton University organist, playing services and accompanying Penna Rose's Chapel Choir as well as presenting frequent organ recitals in the Chapel. In 2000, Lippincott retired as Princeton Organist to focus on her recital career. Westminster awarded her an honorary doctorate in 2001, and in 2017 she received the annual Distinguished Artist Award from the American Guild of Organists. She and her husband Curtis retired to Wellfleet, MA in 2008, where they had maintained a summer home for several years.

Lippincott joined the Lilian Murtagh Concert Management roster in 1967. Karen McFarlane Holtkamp took over the management following Lilian's death in 1976 and was President from 1976–2000; John McElliott succeeded her. Lippincott performed over 600 concerts in over 40 years as one of the organists of Karen McFarlane Artists, Inc.

Lippincott was acclaimed as one of America's outstanding organ virtuosos, and she performed extensively throughout the United States, Canada and Europe. She was a featured recitalist at Alice Tully Hall at Lincoln Center in New York City, at the Spoleto Festival USA, at the American Bach Society Biennial, at the Dublin (Ireland) International Organ Festival, and at conventions of the American Guild of Organists, the Organ Historical Society, and the Music Teachers National Association. She performed on many prominent organs in churches and universities throughout the United States, including Yale, Harvard, Duke, Stanford, Columbia, Notre Dame, and Princeton. She traveled widely in Europe, studying and performing on historic and contemporary organs in the Netherlands, Denmark, Sweden, Germany, Austria, Italy, Switzerland, and France.

Lippincott was especially in demand for Bach recitals and classes. She was a recitalist at the Alice Tully Hall Bach-Handel Tercentennial and she performed at Bach Festivals in Arizona, California, Florida, Massachusetts, Michigan, New York, Ohio, Oregon, and South Carolina. In 2001–2002 she performed a highly acclaimed series of eight Bach organ concerts on outstanding organs throughout New York City, called "Bach in the Big Apple". In 2008–2009 she performed The Art of Fugue at the Baldwin-Wallace Bach Festival, at Westminster’s Bach Week at Princeton Seminary, and at the Boston Early Music Festival.

Throughout her recital career, Lippincott was also recognized for her flair for the contemporary. She premiered many significant contemporary organ works, as well as regularly including 20th-century literature in her recital programs. She was heard in recital broadcasts of contemporary American music, such as ABC's Pilgrimage series and The Musical Fund Society of Philadelphia's presentation of contemporary American music. She played the American premiere of Malcolm Williamson's Organ Symphony at the National Cathedral in Washington, DC; the American premiere of Iain Hamilton's Paraphrase for Organ on Epitaph for This World and Time at the Riverside Church, New York City; and first performances of commissioned works: Epiphanies by Daniel Pinkham at House of Hope Presbyterian Church, St. Paul, MN; Masques d'Afrique for Organ, Trumpet and Percussion by C. Curtis-Smith at the Air Force Academy, CO, at a national convention of the American Guild of Organists; and The Salutation of Gabriel for Organ and Horn by Pinkham at a Peabody Conservatory celebration honoring Karen McFarlane. In 1952, Ainslee Cox composed Prelude for Organ which he dedicated to Lippincott.

Her repertoire was vast and included works for organ and orchestra such as the Poulenc Concerto for Organ, Strings and Timpani; Saint-Saëns Organ Symphony; Barber Toccata Festiva; Jongen Symphonie Concertante; Dupré Poème Héroique; Widor Salvum Fac Populum Tuum; Lockwood Concerto for Organ and Brass; Handel Concertos; Mozart Church Sonatas; and Bach Sinfonias.

She released nineteen CD recordings as well as six long-playing vinyls. Her first recording, released in 1980 on the Gothic label, was Toccatas and Fugues of J.S. Bach on the new Fisk organ at House of Hope Presbyterian Church in St. Paul, Minnesota. Her discography includes works of Bach, Duruflé, Mozart, Mendelssohn, Widor, Alain, and Pinkham on major American organs.

She was famous for her teachings of rhythm and touch in organ music, particularly that of Bach. Her playing was distinguished by rhythmic intensity, a supple technical control, and emotional intensity.

Lippincott died on May 31, 2025, at the age of 89.

== Partial discography ==
Gothic:

- J.S. Bach: Toccatas and Fugues. House of Hope Presbyterian Church, St. Paul, MN.
- J.S. Bach: Clavierübung III and Schübler Chorales. Princeton Theological Seminary.
- J.S. Bach: Concerto Transcriptions. Princeton Theological Seminary.
- J.S. Bach: Preludes and Fugues. Pacific Lutheran University.
- Sinfonia. Organ Concertos and Sinfonias with instrumental ensemble. Princeton Theological Seminary.
- Bach: The Trio Sonatas. St. Thomas Church, New York City.
- Leipzig Chorales of J.S. Bach. Duke University.
- Toccatas and Fugues by Bach. Duke University.
- Princeton University Chapel. Music of Mendelssohn, Duruflé, Howells, Widor.
- Joan Lippincott & The Philadelphia Brass. Princeton University Chapel.
- Mozart and the Organ. Old West Church, Boston, MA.
- Music for a Cathedral. The Cathedral Church of St. John The Divine, New York, NY.
- Franz Liszt: Fantasia and Fugue on the Chorale "Ad Nos, Ad Salutarem Undam" and César Franck: Grande Pièce Symphonique. House of Hope Presbyterian Church, St. Paul, MN.
- J.S. Bach: Art of Fugue. Christ Church, Eastman School of Music, Rochester, NY.
- J.S. Bach: Weimar Preludes and Fugues. Notre Dame University.

PGM:

- The Uncommon Bach: Variants, Rarities and Transcriptions. With George Ritchie. Recorded in conjunction with The American Bach Society.
