= Newberry Memorial Organ =

Pipe organ at Yale University

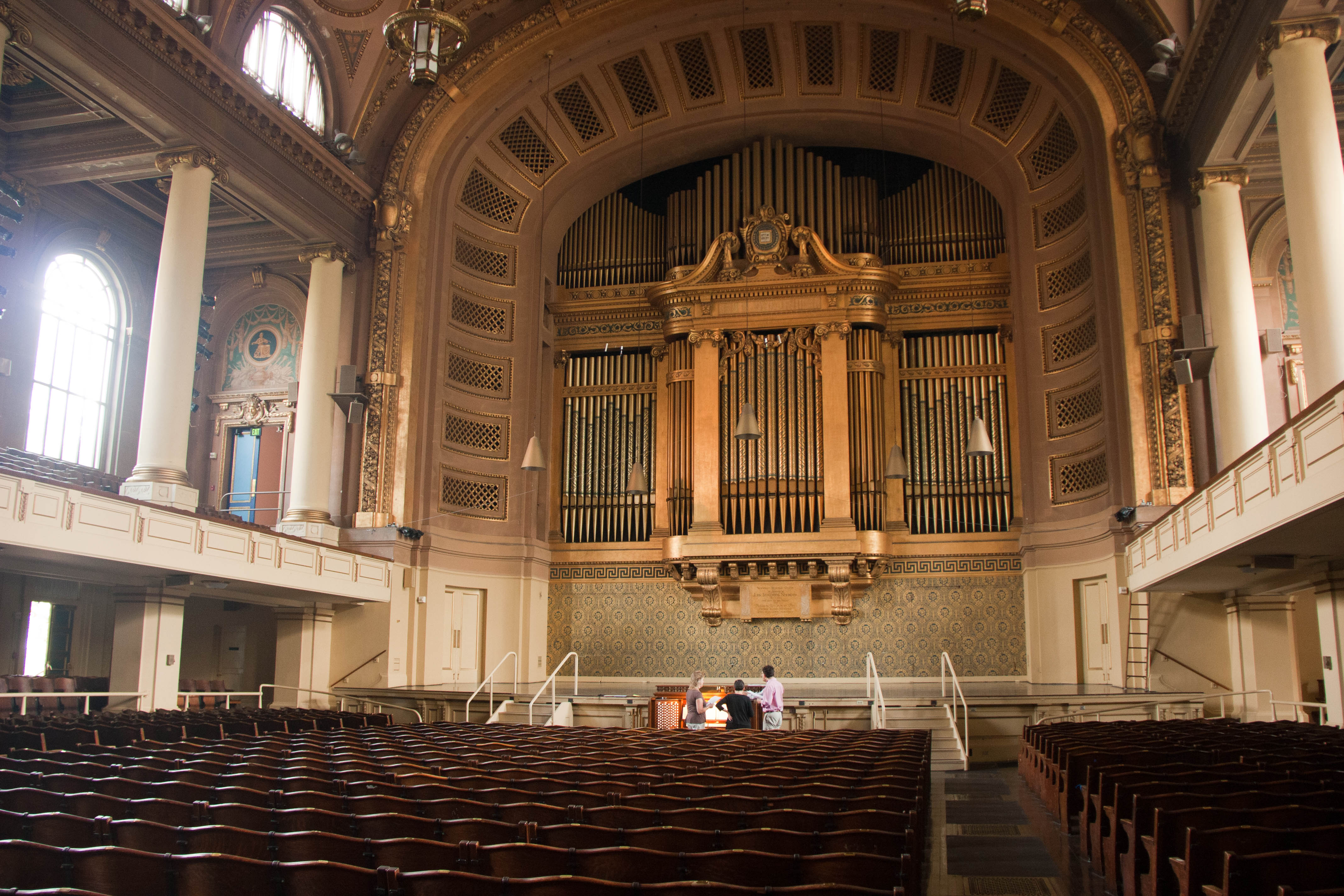
Newberry Memorial Organ at Woolsey Hall

The Newberry Memorial Organ is among the largest and most notable symphonic organs in the world. Located in Woolsey Hall at Yale University, the organ contains 197 ranks and 166 stops comprising 12,617 pipes.

The original Woolsey Hall organ was built by the Hutchings-Votey Organ Company of Boston in 1902. The organ was enlarged in 1915 by the J.W. Steere & Son Organ Company of Springfield, Massachusetts. The instrument was expanded again to its current configuration and size in 1927–1928 by the Skinner Organ Company of Boston as its Opus 722, under the direction of Ernest M. Skinner and his new Superintendent, recently arrived from England, G. Donald Harrison. The completed instrument reflects the combined skills of many talented organ-builders, all overseen by university organist Harry Benjamin Jepson and funded by the family of John Stoughton Newberry.

The legacy of the Newberry Organ, as envisioned by its builders and Yale's curators and musicians, from prior to 1900 to the present, has resulted in a landmark musical instrument, widely considered to reflect a style unique to American organ building. The organ is meticulously maintained in original playing condition, including its original combination action, and receives heavy use for Yale and community events. It is maintained by the Associate Curators of Organs, Nicholas Thompson-Allen and Joseph F. Dzeda.
