= David Craighead (organist) =

American organist (1924–2012)

- Born: January 24, 1924; Strasburg, Pennsylvania
- Died: March 26, 2012 (aged 88) Rochester, New York
- Occupations: Music professor, organist
- Instrument: Organ

David Craighead (January 24, 1924 – March 26, 2012) was a noted American organist.

Craighead was born in Strasburg, Pennsylvania. He studied with Alexander McCurdy at the Curtis Institute of Music in Philadelphia, Pennsylvania, receiving a Bachelor of Music degree in 1946. While at Curtis he met his future wife Marian Reiff, also a pupil of McCurdy. They married in 1948.

From 1955 until his retirement in the summer of 1992 he was both Professor of Organ and Chair of the Organ Division of the Keyboard Department at the Eastman School of Music in Rochester, New York.

Craighead was also organist of St. Paul's Episcopal Church in Rochester, a position he held for 48 years.

In June 1968, Craighead received an honorary Doctor of Music degree from Lebanon Valley College in Annville, Pennsylvania.

He recorded works of Johann Sebastian Bach, Pierre du Mage, César Franck, Felix Mendelssohn, Olivier Messiaen, Samuel Adler, Paul Cooper, Lou Harrison, William Albright, Vincent Persichetti, Max Reger, Leo Sowerby, Dudley Buck, and Louis Vierne.

He was a featured performer at many national conventions and international congresses of the American Guild of Organists, and was voted the 1983 International Performer of the Year by the New York City chapter of the American Guild of Organists. He was the featured organist of the 1975 International Contemporary Organ Music Festival at the Hartt School of Music. He was also an honorary Fellow of the Royal College of Organists. Craighead was the first recipient of Eastman's Eisenhart Award for Teaching Excellence. In the fall of 2008, Eastman dedicated the Craighead-Saunders pipe organ at Christ Church in honor of him and his fellow Eastman organ professor, Russell Saunders.

He died, aged 88, at his Valley Manor home in Rochester, New York, survived by his daughter, Betsy and his son, Jim.
