= Curtis Organ =

Pipe organ in Pennsylvania, United States

Coordinates: 39.9509°N 75.19300°W

The Curtis Organ, named for publisher Cyrus H.K. Curtis, is one of the largest pipe organs in the world with 162 ranks and 10,731 pipes. The concert organ, of American Symphonic design, was manufactured by the Austin Organ Company as its Opus 1416 in 1926 for the Philadelphia Sesquicentennial Exposition. It was known as the "Organists' Organ" because the specifications were formulated by Henry S. Fry, John M'E. Ward, Rollo F. Maitland, Frederick Maxson, and S. Wesley Sears, all prominent Philadelphia organists.

== History ==
Curtis acquired the instrument after the Exposition went bankrupt and donated it to the University of Pennsylvania, where it was divided into two halves and incorporated into Irvine Auditorium at the time of the building's construction.

The organ contains the largest Universal Air Chest ever built by Austin. In its original configuration in the Auditorium building, the organ spread 75 feet across its platform at the Sesquicentennial Exposition. This pressurized room under the pipes allows access to the organ's pneumatic mechanisms while it is playing, and was touted as being able to seat 100 people to dinner comfortably. The organ's mechanical actions were renewed in the 1950s through the generosity of Mary Louise Curtis Bok Zimbalist, daughter of Cyrus H.K. Curtis and founder of The Curtis Institute of Music. In the later 1980s and early 1990s, the organ was connected to a customized MIDI interface, making it, at that time, the world's largest MIDI-capable instrument. In more recent times, the Austin Organ Company carried out a complete mechanical restoration of the organ (with a new console and relay system added), carefully preserving the organ's tonal integrity. It was rededicated in October 2002.

In October 1972 Keith Chapman accompanied the Lon Chaney silent film The Phantom of the Opera as a fund-raiser for the organ that evolved into an annual campus Halloween event. Cyrus Curtis also gave an Austin organ to nearby Drexel University, and to the auditorium of City Hall in Portland, Maine.

== Discography featuring the Curtis Organ ==
• Music From The Curtis Organ, Ted Alan Worth (1988) [CORS CD-141601]
• A Midsummer Night’s Dream, Ken Cowan (1997) [CORS CD-141602]

== See also ==
- Wanamaker Organ
