= Woolsey Hall =

Primary auditorium at Yale University

Coordinates: 41°18′40″N 72°55′33″W

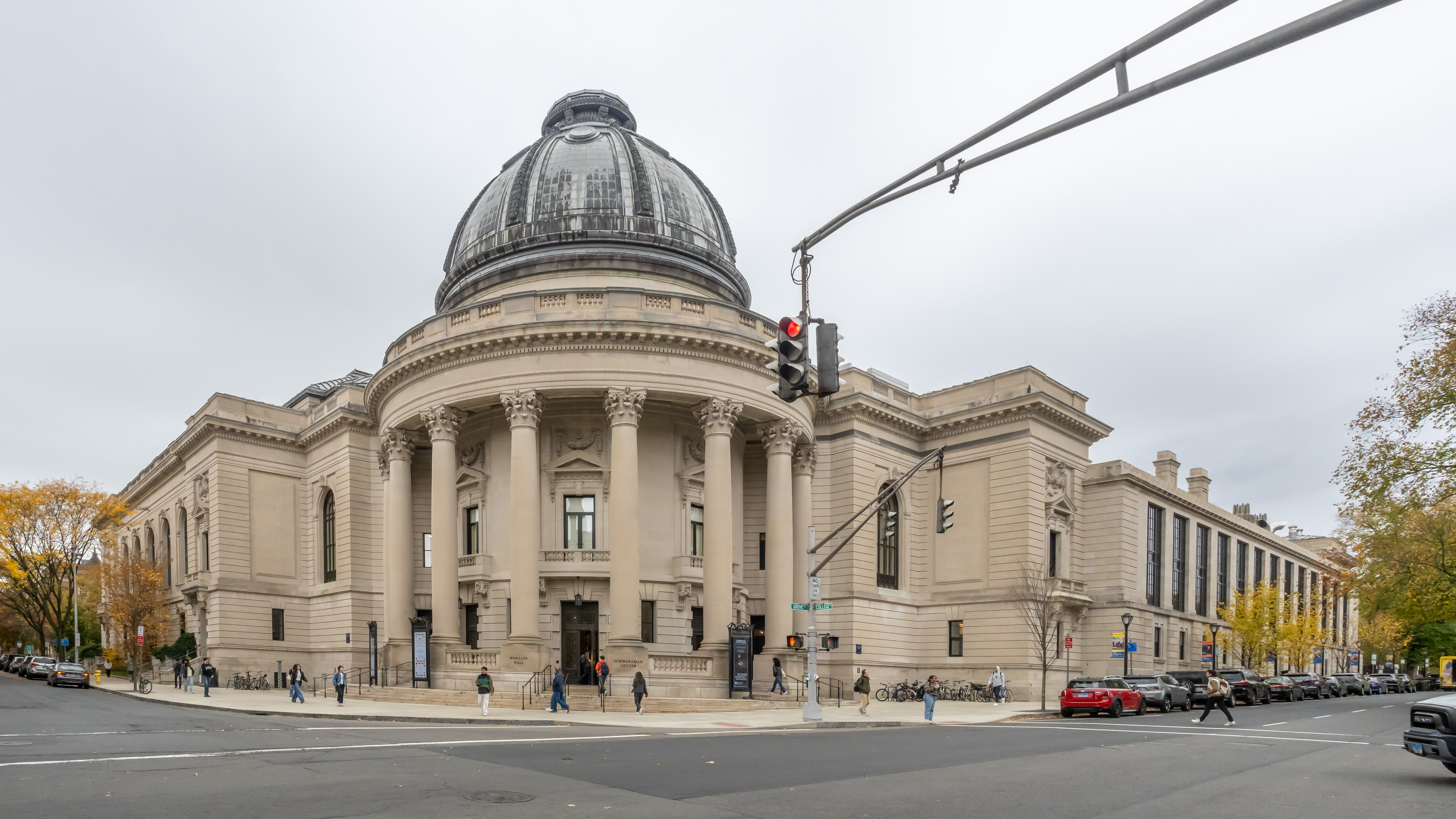
- (2024)
- Interactive map of Woolsey Hall
- Address: New Haven, Connecticut; United States
- Owner: Yale University
- Capacity: 2,650
- Type: Auditorium

Construction
- Opened: 1901
- Architect: Carrère and Hastings

Website
- woolsey.yale.edu

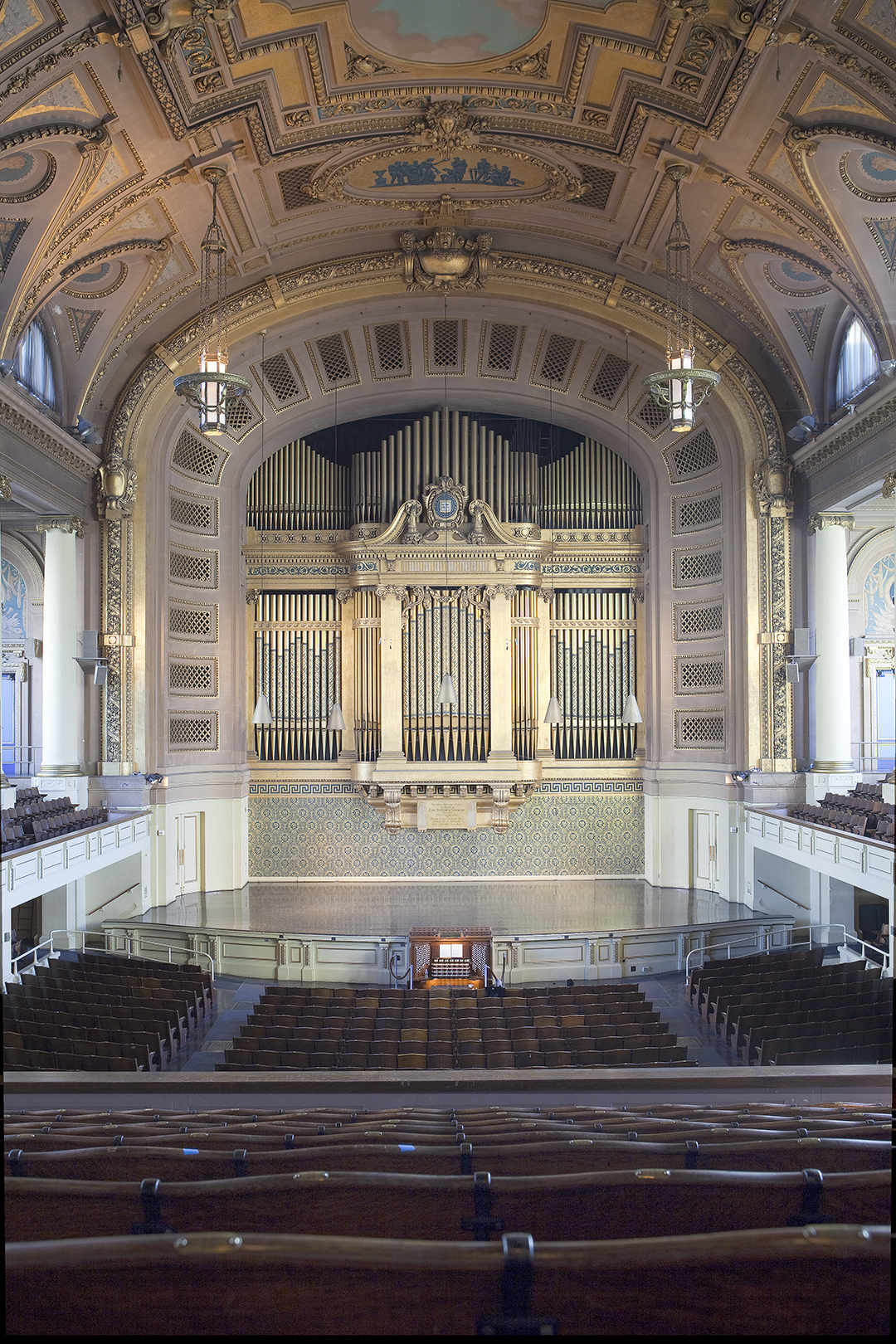
Woolsey Hall, Yale University

Woolsey Hall is the primary auditorium at Yale University, located on the campus' Hewitt Quadrangle in New Haven, Connecticut. It was built as part of the Bicentennial Buildings complex that includes the Memorial Rotunda and the University Commons for the Yale bicentennial celebration in 1901, and was designed by the Beaux-Arts architectural firm Carrère and Hastings. With approximately 2,650 seats, it is the university's largest auditorium and hosts concerts, performances, and university ceremonies including the annual freshman convocation, senior baccalaureate, and presidential inaugurations. The building is named for Theodore Dwight Woolsey, President of Yale from 1846 through 1871.

== History ==
During the 19th century, Yale became one of the largest higher education institutions in the world, establishing seven graduate and professional schools in addition to the undergraduate college founded in 1701. Although Yale was nominally organized as a university in 1887, its constituent schools remained mostly independent of the university administration, and they lacked any shared facilities. In 1896, as one of several initiatives to unify the new university, Yale President Timothy Dwight V proposed the construction of a central dining hall and auditorium, for which the university would need to raise $1.5 to $2 million.

The task of construction fell to the administration of Arthur Twining Hadley, who became president 1899, two years before the university bicentennial. The position of the buildings was selected as a central node between the Old Campus of Yale College and the Sheffield Scientific School, positioning the new university buildings as separate from the dominant College and partial to no school in particular.

Succeeding Battell Chapel as the university's largest assembly space, the new hall was the university's first secular auditorium, coinciding with Hadley's appointment as the first non-ordained person to lead the university. In 1910, a seat on the first balcony was made extra large to accommodate Yale's ultimate "big man on campus," trustee and alumnus William Howard Taft.

== Design and features ==
The architects were Carrère and Hastings, who designed the New York Public Library Main Branch the following decade. Woolsey Hall, built in a Beaux Arts style that contrasted with the university's more somber Victorian Gothic Revival taste in the late 19th century, the new building was considered by critics to be overreaching and gaudy. It houses the Newberry Memorial Organ and functions as the main performance venue for the New Haven Symphony Orchestra, the Yale Bands, the Yale Symphony Orchestra, the Yale Philharmonia, the Yale Glee Club, and many smaller, student-run ensembles such as a cappella singing groups. Woolsey Hall's murals represent the ideal of a classical education and include images of the nine muses and the goddess Athena. They reflect the age when Yale was an all-male college. The Hall is entered via the Memorial Rotunda, a vestibule containing memorials to sons of Yale who lost their lives in all American wars from the Revolutionary War to the Vietnam War.

"The hall's lack of draperies, carpeting and upholstered seats all contribute to its acoustics for organ performance, though the acoustics work far more in favor of the organ than for other sounds. Woolsey Hall predates any major studies within the field of acoustics, so aside from its large size, rectangular shape, hard surfaces and high vaulted ceiling, it has no peculiar architectural properties that contribute positively to its sound. Choral singers are sometimes hampered by Woolsey's muddy resonance, which easily obscures text and delicate timbres, and can also make it difficult to hear oneself on stage."

== See also ==
- List of concert halls
