= Stambaugh Auditorium =

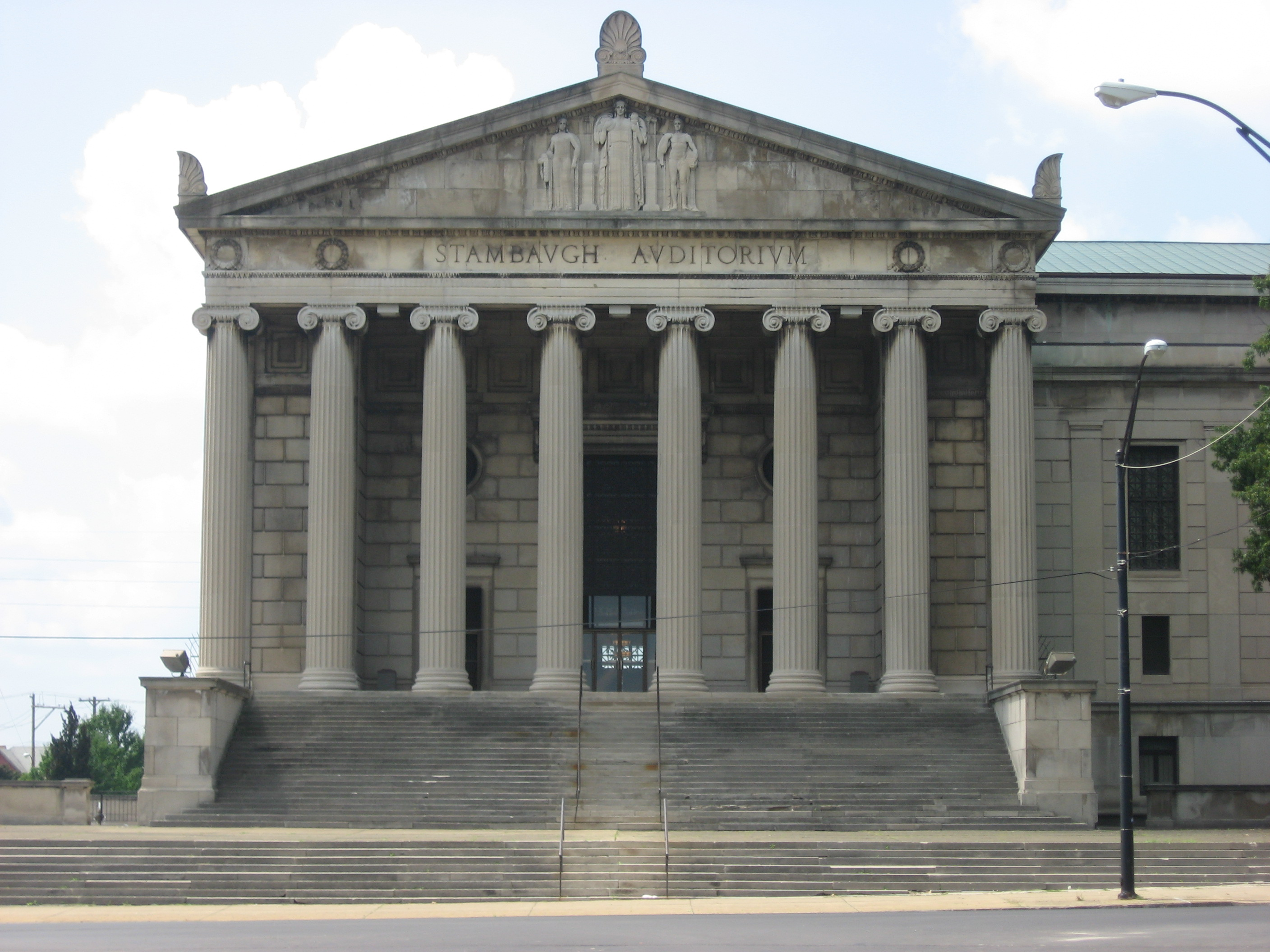
- Fifth Avenue entrance
- Interactive map of Stambaugh Auditorium
- Location: 1000 Fifth Avenue; Youngstown, Ohio
- Owner: The Henry H. Stambaugh Auditorium Association
- Seating type: Reserved
- Capacity: 2,553
- Stambaugh Auditorium
- U.S. National Register of Historic Places
- Location within Ohio Location within the United States
- Coordinates: 41°6′50″N 80°39′7″W
- Area: 2.4 acres (1.0 ha)
- Built: 1926
- Architect: Helme & Corbett
- Architectural style: Beaux Arts
- NRHP reference No.: 84003781
- Added to NRHP: February 9, 1984
- Type: Indoor theatre

Construction
- Opened: December 5, 1926

Stambaugh Auditorium is a concert hall located in Youngstown, Ohio, United States. First opened in 1926, it was listed on the National Register of Historic Places in 1984. Stambaugh Auditorium was established through the generosity of Henry H. Stambaugh, one of the city's leading businessmen in the early 20th century, who had decreed in his will that there was to be a venue built for the entertainment, enjoyment and education of Youngstown and surrounding communities. Many Stambaugh events are offered at reasonable ticket rates and, at times, no cost at all, as to reflect the mission statement outlined by Henry H. Stambaugh's will.

The centerpiece of the complex is the Concert Hall, which can accommodate a crowd of 2,553 and houses the restored E.M. Skinner Pipe Organ. The venue also features the Jeanne D. Tyler Grand Ballroom, the Anne K. Christman Memorial Hall, and a Formal Garden at the southern end of the building, all of which can be rented for private functions. Events hosted at the auditorium include concerts, business functions, weddings, graduations and dance competitions.

== History ==
In 1926, The Henry H. Stambaugh Memorial Auditorium was dedicated, and a dream of Henry Stambaugh, local industrialist and philanthropist, was realized. As a bequest to the city of Youngstown, Mr. Stambaugh envisioned a site to "be used for the enjoyment, pleasure, entertainment and education of the community residing in the Youngstown and contiguous thereto…" The Auditorium was constructed at a cost of $1.3 million, designed by Harvey Wiley Corbett of the New York firm of Helme and Corbett and is modeled after the public auditorium in Springfield, Massachusetts, which was designed from the Pantheon in Paris.

On December 5, 1926, a formal dedication was held, and on December 6, 1926, the Monday Musical Club presented the first concert at Stambaugh, featuring humorist Will Rogers. Since that day, Stambaugh has hosted a wide variety of performers, educators and speakers. Artists from Tony Bennett to Bob Dylan, American Ballet to Liberace, Bruce Springsteen to the Cleveland Orchestra and countless others have all graced the main stage.

== Preservation ==
Stambaugh Auditorium has undergone several renovations and restorations to preserve the building's natural integrity. The Anne Christman Memorial Hall was restored in 1995, followed by the Concert Hall in 2004 and office space improvements in 2004 and 2006. Over the years, additional parking was also added. Most recently, the ballroom renovation and stage enhancements have all been part of continuing Henry H. Stambaugh's legacy to provide a facility for the entertainment and education of the community.

One of the many projects completed in recent years was the restoration of the E.M. Skinner Pipe Organ, which is housed in the Concert Hall. The restoration began in 2009 and was completed in the fall of 2011. The organ was disassembled after years of neglect and water damage. It was shipped to New Haven, Connecticut to the Thompson Allen Company. The father of the owner of the Thompson Allen Company worked for E.M. Skinner. The Thompson Allen Company cleaned and repaired the instrument, which was then returned and reassembled. The Organ was restored to its original 1926 glory and was rededicated in October 2011. It is currently the only E.M. Skinner organ in the area and one of few working ones in the entire country. Guests marvel at the instrument, especially when on behind-the-scenes tours of the organ chambers.

Plans for an exterior renovation of Stambaugh Auditorium aim to restore the building's appearance to its 1926 dedication state. The project includes cleaning the exterior to uncover the Ionic columns and front iron scrollwork, and repointing the masonry joints to prevent moisture infiltration and improve thermal efficiency. Additional exterior lighting will be installed to illuminate the building at night, alongside a restoration of the Fifth Avenue stairs. These improvements are intended to preserve the structure and maintain its facilities.

== Events ==
The jazz ensemble Airmen of Note performing in 2019

Stambaugh Auditorium has grown to be much more than a wedding venue. With national tours, local shows, private events, fundraisers and dance competitions, Stambaugh has become very competitive in the local market as a premier event facility. High school and college commencements, proms and business events are other examples of the variety of events that have grown in popularity over recent years.

=== Past National Acts ===
1956 Chuck Berry, Bill Haley & His Comets

1957 Roy Orbison, Eddie Cochran, Carl Perkins, Gene Vincent & His Blue Caps, The Drifters, Fats Domino

1958 Dion & The Belmonts, Bobby Darin, Little Anthony & The Imperials, The Isley Brothers, The Everly Brothers, Buddy Holly & The Crickets

1965 The Byrds, Bo Diddley, The Four Tops, Stevie Wonder, The Marvelettes, The Spinners

1968 Ray Charles, Johnny Cash, James Brown, Smokey Robinson & The Miracles

1970s B.B. King, The Temptations, Little Richard, The Beach Boys

1992 Bob Dylan, Todd Rundgren

1996 Bruce Springsteen

2000 "Weird Al" Yankovic, Jethro Tull, Meat Loaf

2004 B.B. King, Art Garfunkel, Brad Paisley

2012 America

2013 Florida Georgia Line, Parmalee, Creedence Clearwater Revisited

2014 Josh Turner, R5, Kansas, Joe Nichols & Josh Thompson, Newsboys

2015 Fifth Harmony, TobyMac, Kirk Franklin, Kenny G

2016 Three Dog Night, Steven Curtis Chapman, ZZ Top, Kenny Rogers, REO Speedwagon

2017 Old Dominion, Styx, Michael Bolton

2018 38 Special, The Beach Boys, Kool & the Gang, Bush, Michael McDonald

2019 John Mellencamp, The Guess Who, Glenn Miller Orchestra, Celtic Woman

2020 The Oak Ridge Boys, Kansas

2022 Engelbert Humperdinck
