= Jongen =

Jongen is a surname. Notable people with the surname include:

- Joseph Jongen (1873–1953) Belgian organist, composer, and music educator
- Léon Jongen (1884–1969), Belgian composer and organist, brother of Joseph
- Marc Jongen (born 1968), German politician

== See also ==
- Jørgen
