= Ted Alan Worth =

American organist

Ted Alan Worth (November 5, 1935 – December 27, 1998) was an American church and concert organist, recording artist, and entrepreneur of the pipe organ.

== Biography ==
An associate of Virgil Fox, he performed during his career on some of the largest pipe organs in the United States and made numerous compact disc recordings.

Between 1966 and 1978 he toured throughout the U.S. and Canada with organist Andy Crow as the Worth/Crow Duo; the duo were managed on the tour by Columbia Artists Management.

In November 1983 he played the inaugural concert on the Ruffatti organ at the Ruth Barrus Concert Hall of Ricks College (now Brigham Young University-Idaho).

As the American representative for Fratelli Ruffatti, he oversaw the design of major installations such as the organ in Cathedral of Saint Mary of the Assumption in San Francisco, CA, Louise M. Davies Symphony Hall, San Francisco, CA and the Crystal Cathedral organ in Garden Grove, CA.

He is buried in the cemetery of Washington Memorial Chapel at Valley Forge National Historical Park.

== Selected discography ==
- Ted Alan Worth - Legacy V (1965) Aeolian-Skinner Organ of 113-ranks at Southern Baptist Theological Seminary. [OA5001CD]
- Tribute Re-release of a 1969 recording made on the two-manual, 23-rank Ruffatti organ at Our Lady of Grace Church in Johnston, Rhode Island. [Organs Arts]
- Ted Alan Worth in Concert on the Rodgers Touring Organ (1978) Rogers "Black Beauty" Touring Organ, [Organarts MG-7-202,815]
- Praise to the Lord (1978) with the San Francisco Civic Corale Chamber Chorus. Rodgers Classic Series 250 with Pipes [Organarts WSA-770515]
- Ted Alan Worth performs on the Largest American Organ in Europe (1982) Rogers Organ, Auditorium of San Francisco in the Cáceres Arts Complex, Cáceres, Spain [Centerline CPI 8004/5; 2-LP set]
- Music From The Curtis Organ, Ted Alan Worth (1988) Curtis Sesquicentennial Organ Austin, Irvine Auditorium, University of Pennsylvania, Philadelphia, Pennsylvania [CORS CD-141601]
- Pipes Alive! Ted Alan Worth - Great Skinner Organ at Girard College Chapel, Philadelphia, Pennsylvania [DTR9301CD]
