= Irvine Auditorium =

Concert hall in Philadelphia, Pennsylvania, United States

Coordinates: 39.9509°N 75.19300°W

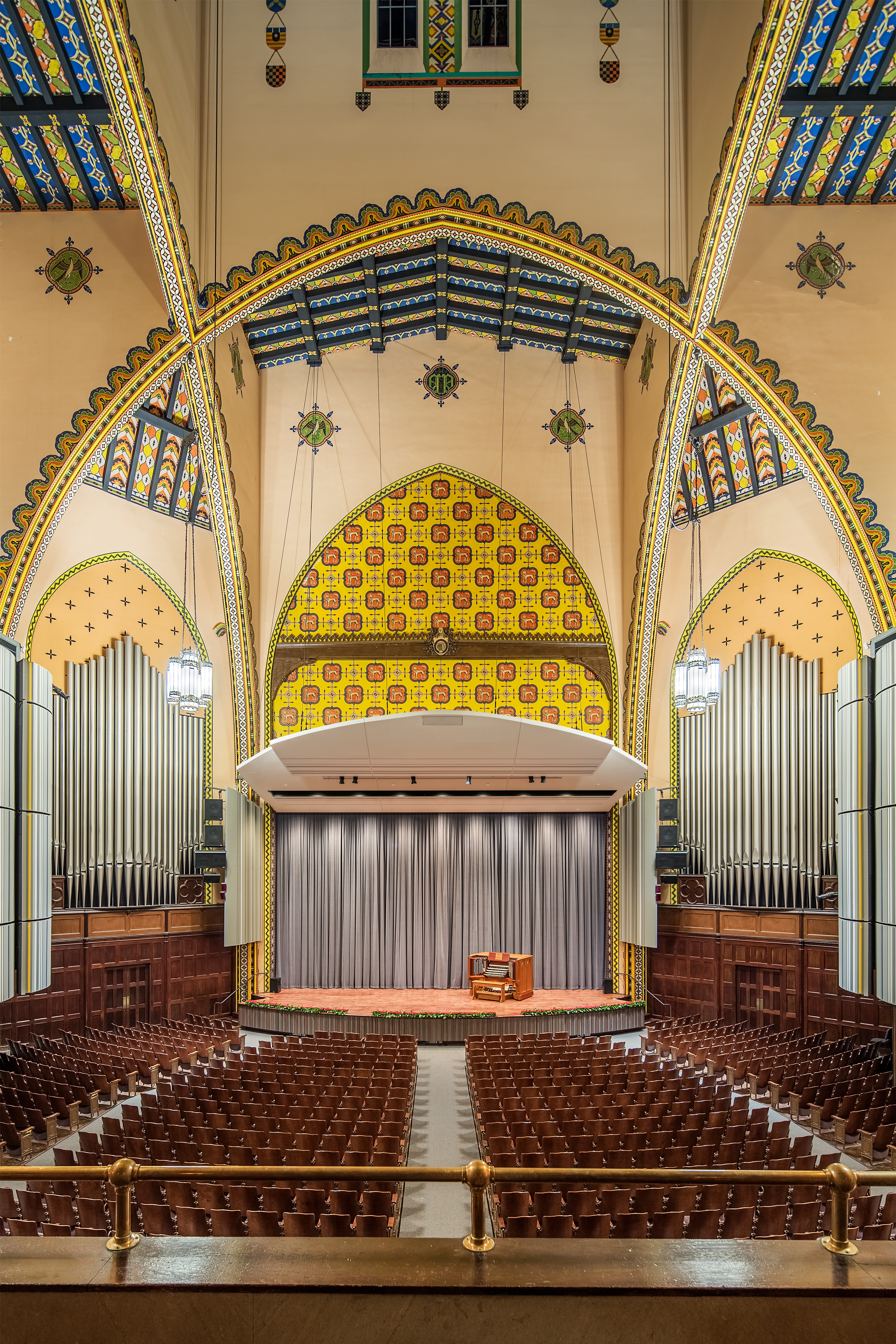
Irvine Auditorium at the University of Pennsylvania in Philadelphia

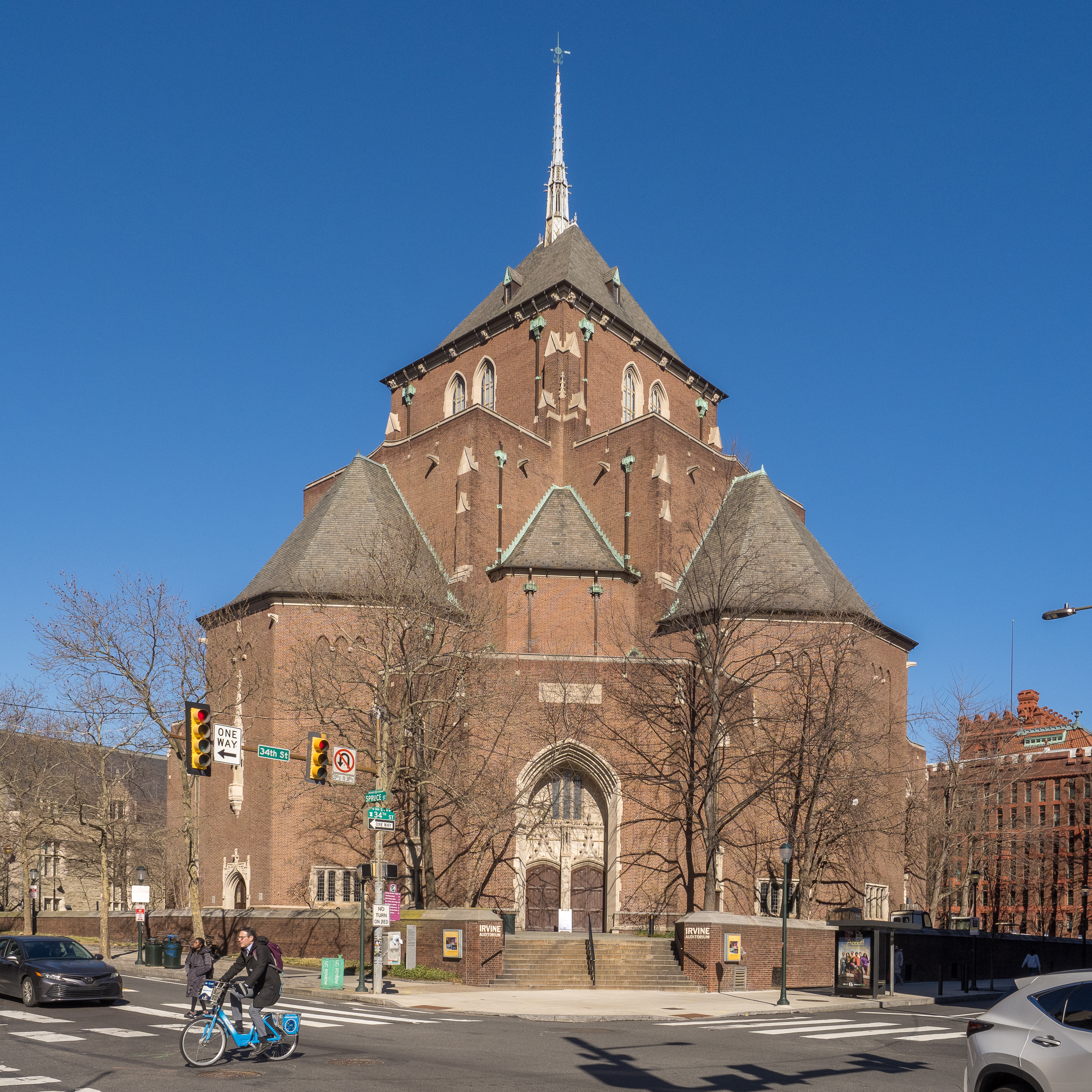
Irvine Auditorium Exterior

Irvine Auditorium is a performance venue at 3401 Spruce Street on the campus of the University of Pennsylvania, in Philadelphia. It was designed by the firm of prominent Philadelphia area architect Horace Trumbauer and built 1926–1932. Irvine Auditorium is notable for its nearly 11,000-pipe Curtis Organ, the world's 22nd-largest pipe organ (by ranks), originally built for the Sesquicentennial Exposition of 1926 and donated to the university in 1928. The building was opened in May, 1929.

Seating capacity is 1,260. (Prior to renovation the seating capacity was 1,976.) The octagonal auditorium featured side balconies that faced each other, at right angles to the stage. The building was restored and renovated in 1997–2000 by Venturi, Scott Brown & Associates, Inc, who removed the side balconies to improve the acoustic quality, as well as to create more intimate performance spaces.
