= Organ reform movement =

Trend in pipe organ building

The Organ Reform Movement or Orgelbewegung (also called the Organ Revival Movement) was a mid-20th-century trend in pipe organ building, originating in Germany. The movement was most influential in the United States in the 1930s through 1970s, and began to wane in the 1980s. It arose with early interest in historical performance and was strongly influenced by Albert Schweitzer's championing of historical instruments by Gottfried Silbermann and others, as well as by Schweitzer's opinion that organs should be judged primarily by their ability to perform with clarity the polyphonic Baroque music of J. S. Bach (1685–1750). Concert organist E. Power Biggs was a leading popularizer of the movement in the United States, through his many recordings and radio broadcasts. The movement ultimately went beyond the "Neo-Baroque" copying of old instruments to endorse a new philosophy of organ building, "more Neo than Baroque". The movement arose in response to perceived excesses of symphonic organ building, but eventually symphonic organs regained popularity after the reform movement generated excesses of its own.

== Characteristics ==
Bach: Wer nur den lieben Gott lässt walten (BWV 642)
German Baroque chorale prelude

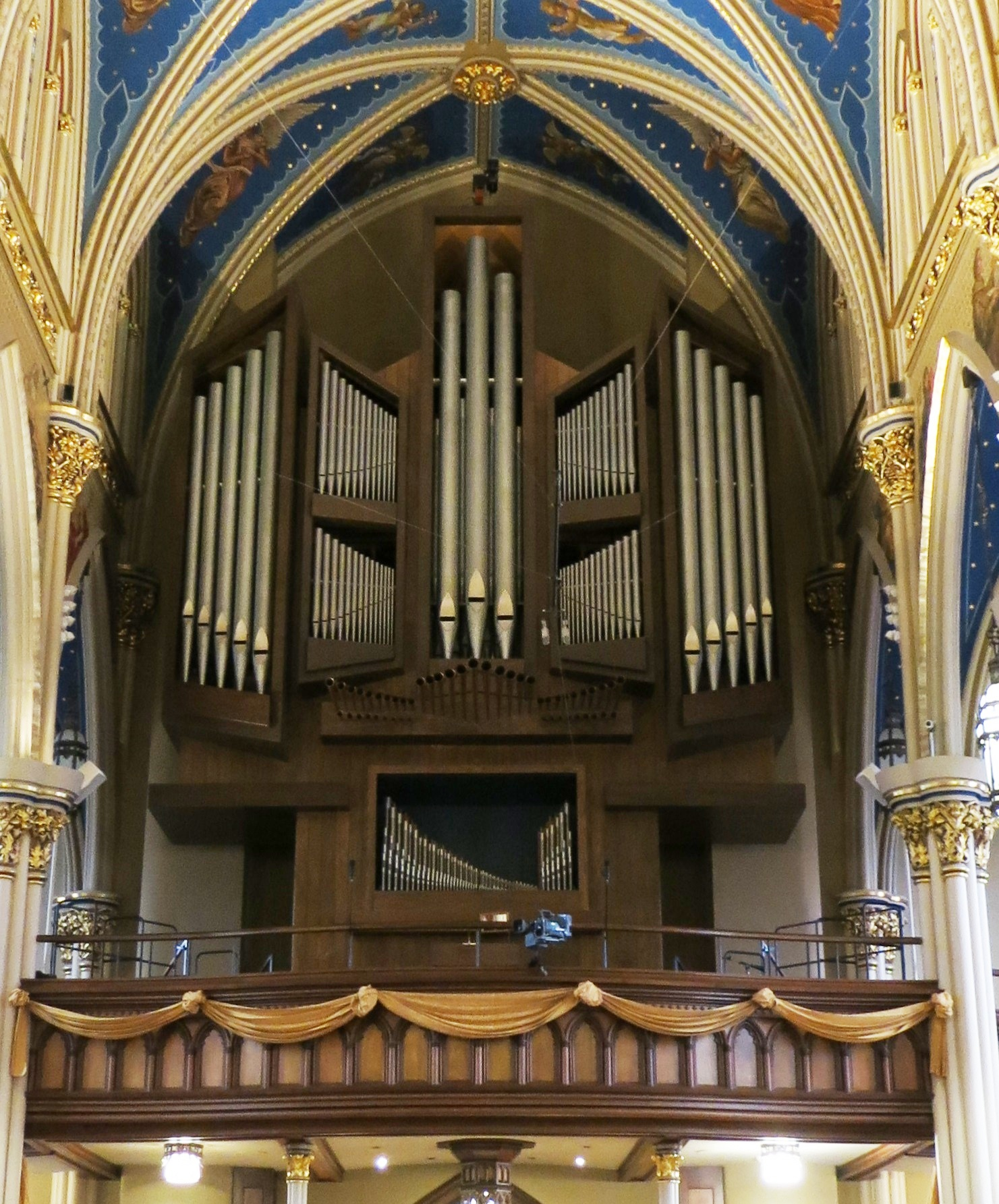
Holtkamp Organ #1,939 (1978–2015) at University of Notre Dame

The Organ Reform Movement sought to turn away from many of the perceived excesses of Romantic or Symphonic organ building and repertoire, in favor of organs understood to be more similar to those of the Baroque Era in Northern Germany, especially those built by Arp Schnitger. This took the form of a "vertical" style of tonal registration in which ensembles were ideally built up with no pitch being duplicated in the same octave, and then the ensembles were crowned with high-pitched mixture stops. The movement endorsed the so-called Werkprinzip, in which each division of the instrument's pipework was based on a principal-scale rank of a different octave.

Organ voicers strove for an articulate pipe speech characterized by a short burst of "chiff" sound at the start of each note, and avoided "nicking" the pipe edges and other techniques of achieving symphonic-style "smoothness". Low wind pressures were revived. Casework was sometimes eschewed in favor of open standing pipework, and shuttered swell boxes became less common.

In Europe the movement was indelibly connected with tracker action (mechanical instruments). In North America this was less emphatic, and many US and Canadian instruments characteristic of the Organ Reform Movement had electro-pneumatic or direct electric action. North American buildings tend to have substantial architectural and acoustical differences from the European churches where most organ music was written, and this also had implications for successful organbuilding.

Some of the leading organ-builders of the movement were:

- (in Northern Europe) Rudolf von Beckerath, Dirk Andries Flentrop, Frobenius Orgelbyggeri, Marcussen & Søn;
- (in North America) G. Donald Harrison, Holtkamp Organ Company, Lawrence Phelps, C. B. Fisk, Schlicker Organ Company, Wicks Organ Company.

== Reversals ==
A common criticism of the Organ Reform Movement is that its principles were often taken to extremes and became more dogmatic than musical, while ruining many fine symphonic organs and disappointing many listeners. Many of the Reform instruments survive, but some of the alterations that the movement executed on pre-movement instruments have since been reversed to support a wider range of repertoire, such as on the notable pipe organs of Auckland Town Hall, Princeton University Chapel, and Chicago's Rockefeller Chapel.
