= Holtkamp Organ Company =

American pipe organ manufacturer

The Holtkamp Organ Company of Cleveland, Ohio, is the United States' oldest continuously operating pipe organ workshop. The company was founded in 1855 by Gottlieb Votteler. The work produced by the shop has evolved over the years in terms of architectural style, sound, and mechanism. During this time, the company has had a number of names, including: The Votteler Organ Company, The Votteler-Hettche Organ Company, The Votteler-Holtkamp-Sparling Organ Company, and finally in 1951, The Holtkamp Organ Company.

When Gottlieb Votteler opened his shop for building pipe organs in Cleveland in 1855, he built small instruments with mechanical key action and mechanical stop action. During the Votteler-Hettche years, robust mechanical actions were replaced with tubular–pneumatic actions, transitioning to electro-pneumatic actions in the Votteler-Holtkamp-Sparling years, and Holtkamp Organ years. The modern company builds electro-pneumatic, electric slider, and mechanical action organs.

== The Vottelers (1855–1903) ==
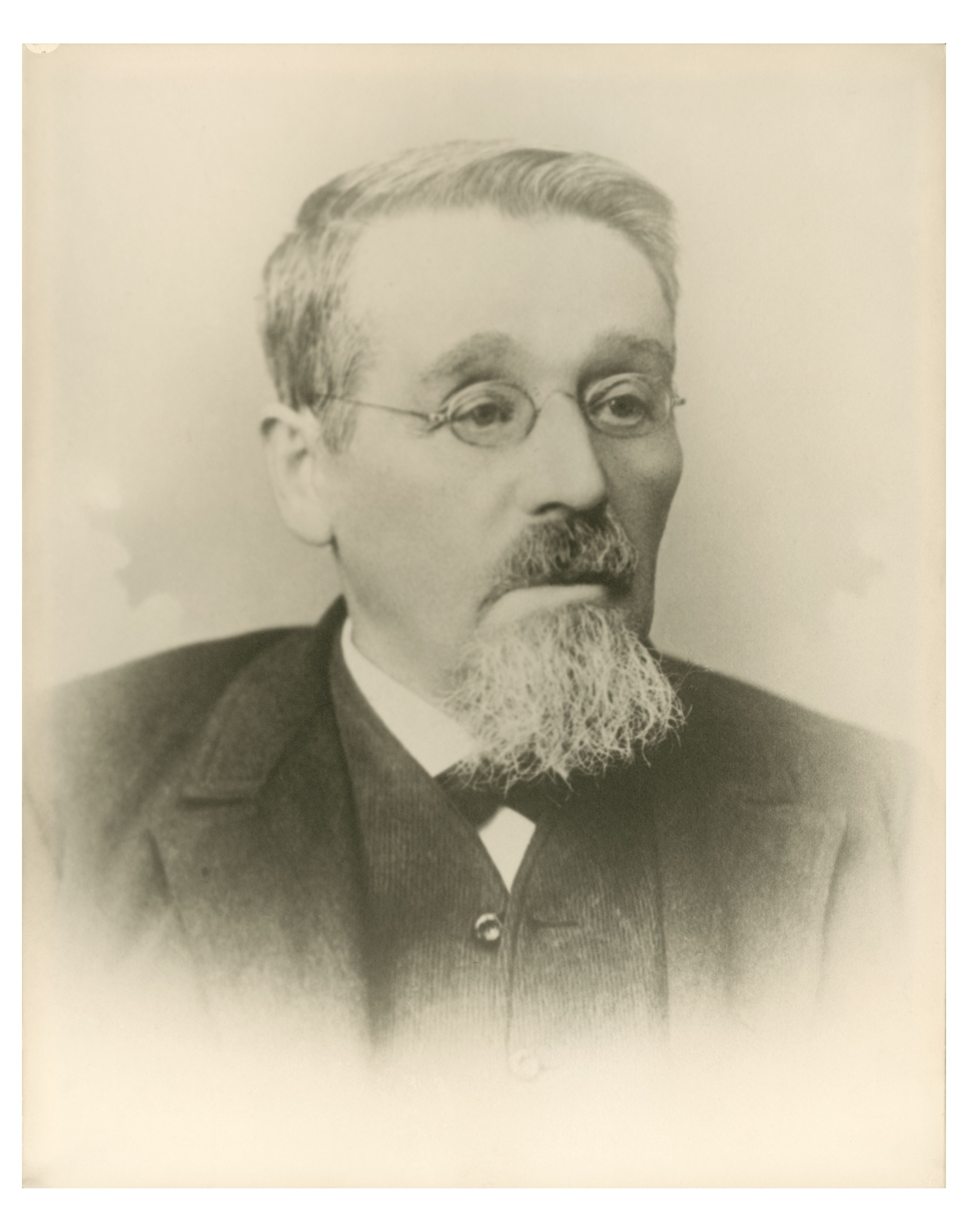
Gottlieb Votteler, Original founder of the company.

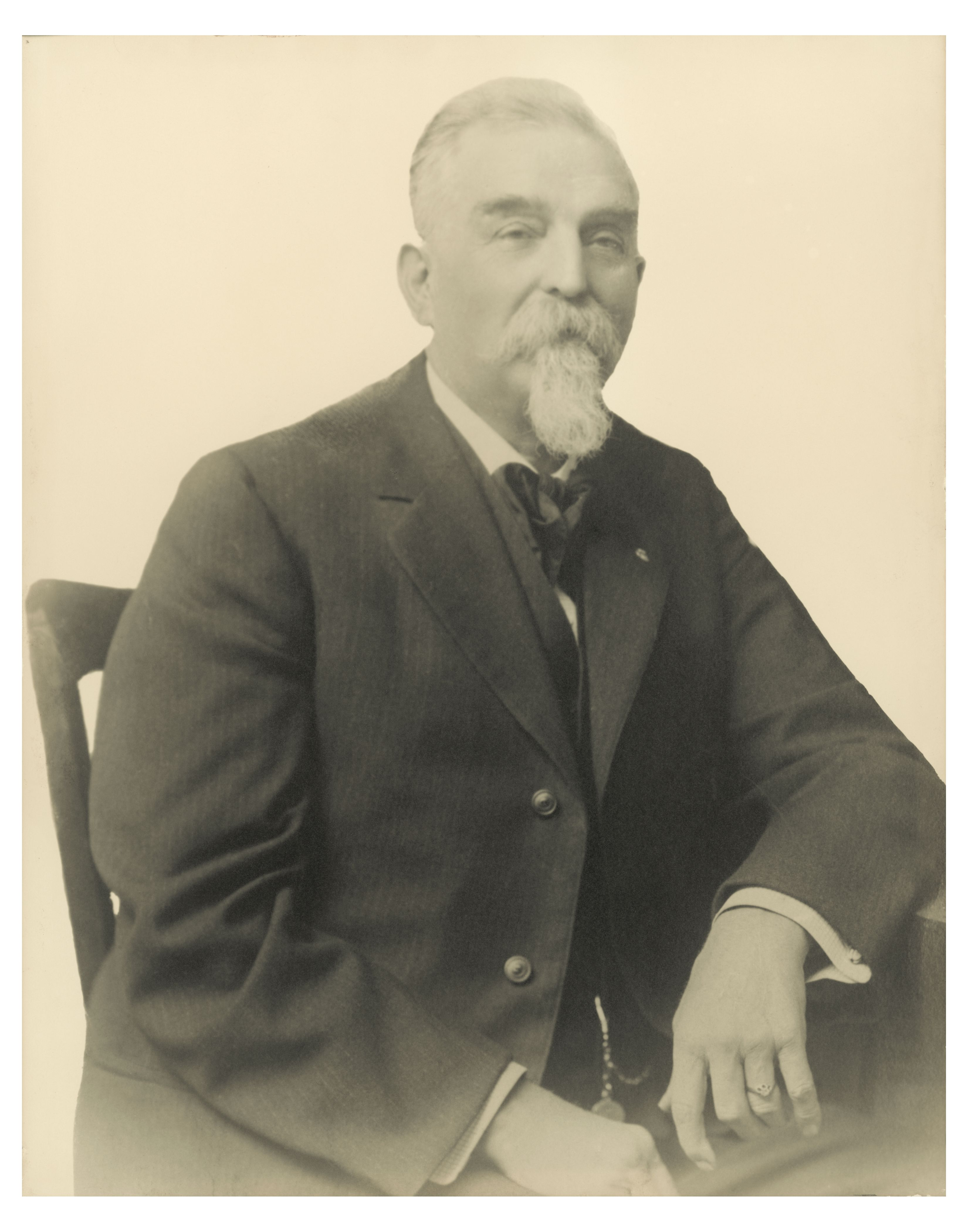
Heinrich Votteler, son of Gottlieb

As with so many pipe organ builders, The Holtkamp Organ Company started small and local. The founder, Gottlieb Votteler, trained as a general musical instrument builder in Reutlingen, Wittenburg, Germany. He immigrated to the United States in 1847. He eventually settled in Cleveland, Ohio and opened a shop for building pipe organs in 1855. After some time, he was joined by his son, Heinrich. They ran the company together until Gottlieb's death in 1894 (which was coincidentally also the year in which Walter Holtkamp Sr. was born). The instruments which they built were primarily one or two manual and pedal, some with divided keyboards. Wind pressures were low, in the 3” range. Visual design was neo-Gothic or neo-Classical.

=== List of organs ===
- Zoar Community Church (1873; Zoar, Ohio)
- Rootstown Congressional Church (1896; Rootstown, Ohio)

== Henry Holtkamp (1903–1931) ==
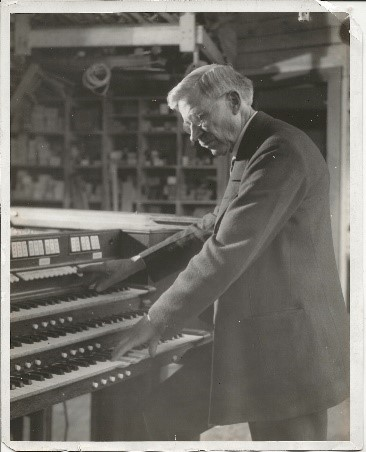
Henry Holtkamp, Company President from 1903 to 1931

Heinrich Votteler ran the company until 1903 when he was joined by Heinrich "Henry" Holtkamp. Henry was born in New Knoxville, Ohio. He was a church organist and the owner of a parlor musical instrument store in St. Mary's, Ohio. In his store he sold music boxes, harmoniums, pianos, and the occasional small pipe organ. It is through these occasional small pipe organs that Heinrich and Henry may have known each other. At that time in Ohio, Germans were the primary immigrant group. Most German immigrants also spoke their native tongue as their primary language. It is not a stretch to imagine that Heinrich and Henry knew each other through a German "good old boy" network.

When Henry moved to Cleveland and began work at the shop, the company underwent a name change to The Votteler-Hettche Organ Company (1903 – 1914). Ownership of the company was shared equally between Heinrich Votteler, Henry Holtkamp, and John Hettche, who was an investor knowledgeable regarding pipe organs. At this time Mary Holtkamp, daughter of Henry, began working in the shop. During this period, the robust mechanical action gave way to tubular pneumatic actions. Specifications became more weighted towards 16’ and 8’ stops. Wind pressures slowly climbed to the 4” range. Consoles became detached. Visual design remained as previously, either neo-Gothic or neo-Classical.

In 1911 Henry was joined by Allan Gordon Sparling. Mr. Sparling was a Canadian by birth, had extensive experience in organ building, and great skill in the new pneumatic technology that was becoming dominant in pipe organ building worldwide. In 1914 the company underwent a second name change to The Votteler-Holtkamp-Sparling Organ Company. In general, specifications had less and less upper work, and more 16’ and 8’ stops. Brightness, when desired, was for the most part provided by super couplers. Wind pressures went up to a standard 5”, sometimes ranging higher to 8”. The prevalent design style was still neo-Gothic or neo-Classical.

=== List of organs ===
- Crow River Lutheran Church (1907; Belgrade, Minnesota)
- St. Alouysius (1925; Columbus, Ohio)
- St. Augustine Catholic Church (1925; Barberton, Ohio)
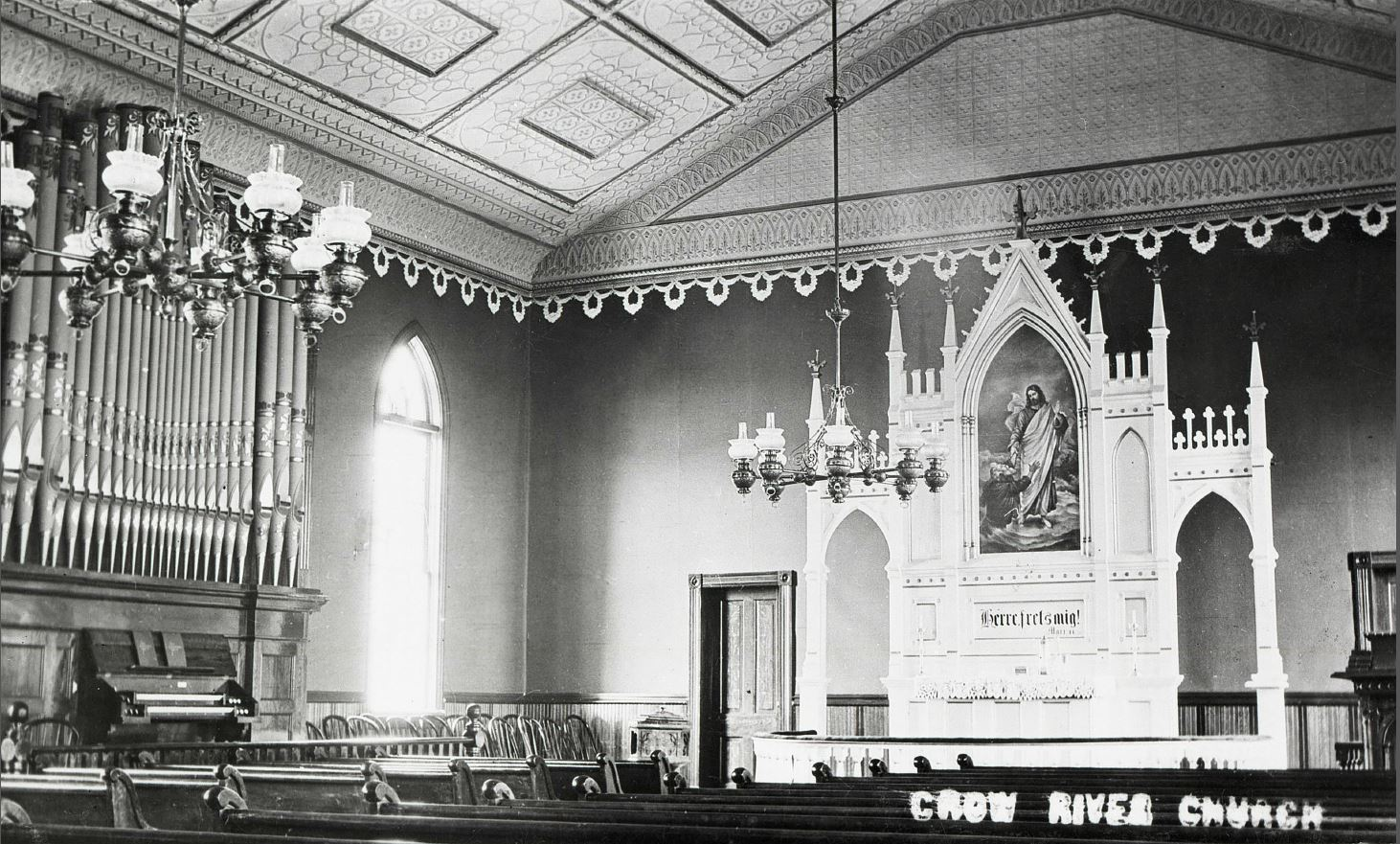
Crow River Lutheran Church

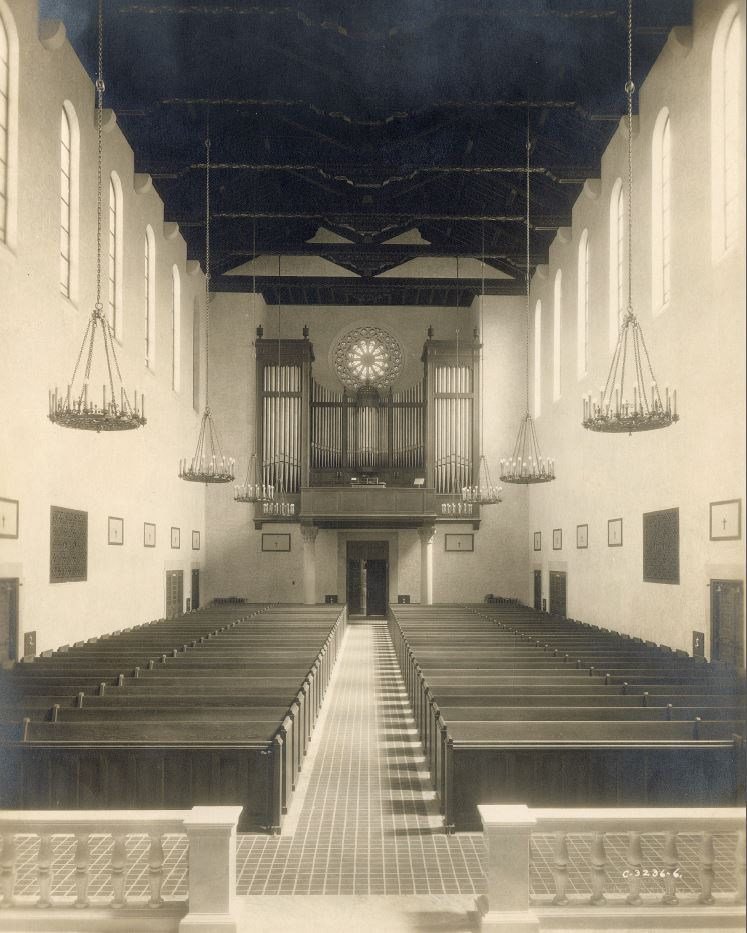
St. Augustine Catholic Church

== Walter Henry Holtkamp (1919–1962) ==
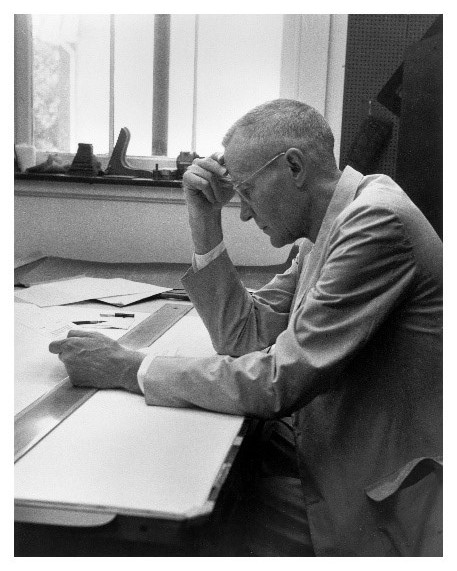
Walter Henry Holtkamp, Company President from 1919 to 1962

In 1919, Walter Henry Holtkamp returned from Europe after two years in the Army during the First World War. He joined the firm and began working side by side with his father. The company prospered and expanded its geographic range from the east coast to the Dakotas. The late 1920s and early 1930s were difficult times for the shop, times that brought with them multiple challenges. First was the Great Depression. With the Stock Market Crash of 1929 the optimism of the Roaring Twenties began to evaporate. In March 1931, Henry Holtkamp died in Minot, ND while fulfilling a contract at All Saints Episcopal Church. In June of that year Mary Holtkamp died. Walter Holtkamp Sr. was left as the sole creative director of the firm.

As the 1930s began the company was still building as many as twenty organs in a year. By 1934 that number had dwindled to four. It was at this point that Walter met Melville Smith. Melville Smith had been hired as a professor of music theory at Western Reserve University in 1930. Following his appointment, Smith journeyed to France to study with Nadia Boulanger, where through his association with Andre Marchal, Joseph Bonnet, and others in the Paris organ scene, he became aware of and inspired by the music which was then being rediscovered, the organ music of the 16th, 17th and 18th centuries. It was through this association, and the association with Arthur Quimby, an organist at the Cleveland Museum of Art, that Walter's work began its movement away from a more orchestral oriented organ of the early 1930s, best suited to homophonic music, towards an instrument that would render clear polyphony.

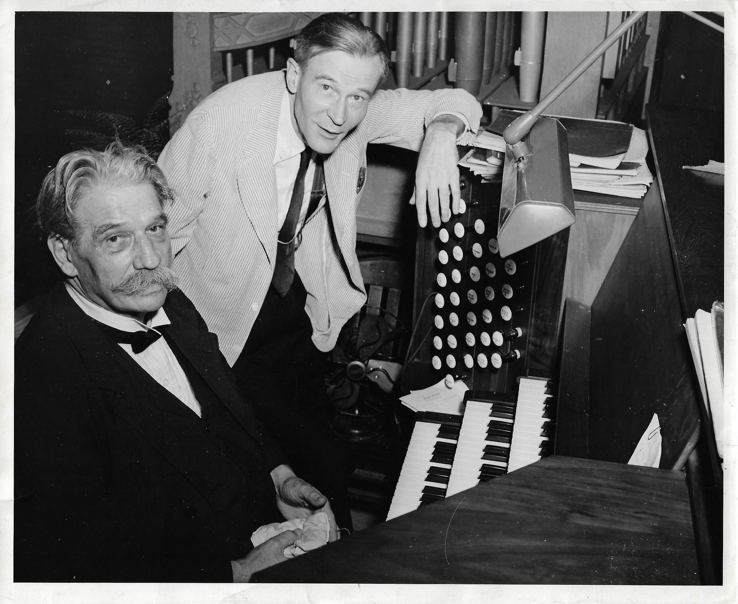
Walter Henry Holtkamp Sr.

This evolution began with a small experimental organ on which Smith and Quimby played literature from the 17th and 18th centuries. This was followed by the designing of a Rückpositiv division for the E. M. Skinner organ at the Cleveland Museum of Art. This Rückpositiv was designed to be a foil to the Great, a secondary manual division of great color and transparency, which could compete with the Great through its position, brightness, and differing timbre. This Rückpositiv division contained the following attributes: the chest had a quick and responsive action, the voicing was transparent and colorful, and the pipework was exposed. These were the basic concepts with which Walter would work for the remainder of his career.

Under the direction of Walter Holtkamp Sr., the company became famous as a pioneer of the Organ Reform Movement in the United States. So much so, that in 1949, while in the United States for a lecture at the University of Chicago, Albert Schweitzer visited Cleveland to play the Holtkamp Rückpositiv at the Cleveland Museum of Art, the only American instrument he requested play. Schweitzer had written to Walter Holtkamp from Günsbach, Alsace, May 22, 1934: "Bravo for the first Rückpositiv in America, I congratulate."

=== List of organs ===
- Our Lady of Peace Experimental Organ (1933; Cleveland, Ohio)
- Cleveland Museum of Art Rückpositiv (1933; Cleveland, Ohio)
- St. John's Roman Catholic Church (1934; Covington, Kentucky)
- St. Paul's Episcopal Church (1952; Cleveland Heights, Ohio)
- MIT Chapel (1955; Cambridge, Massachusetts)
- Portative Organ (1935; Cleveland, Ohio)
- St. John's Abbey and University Church (1961; Collegeville, Minnesota)
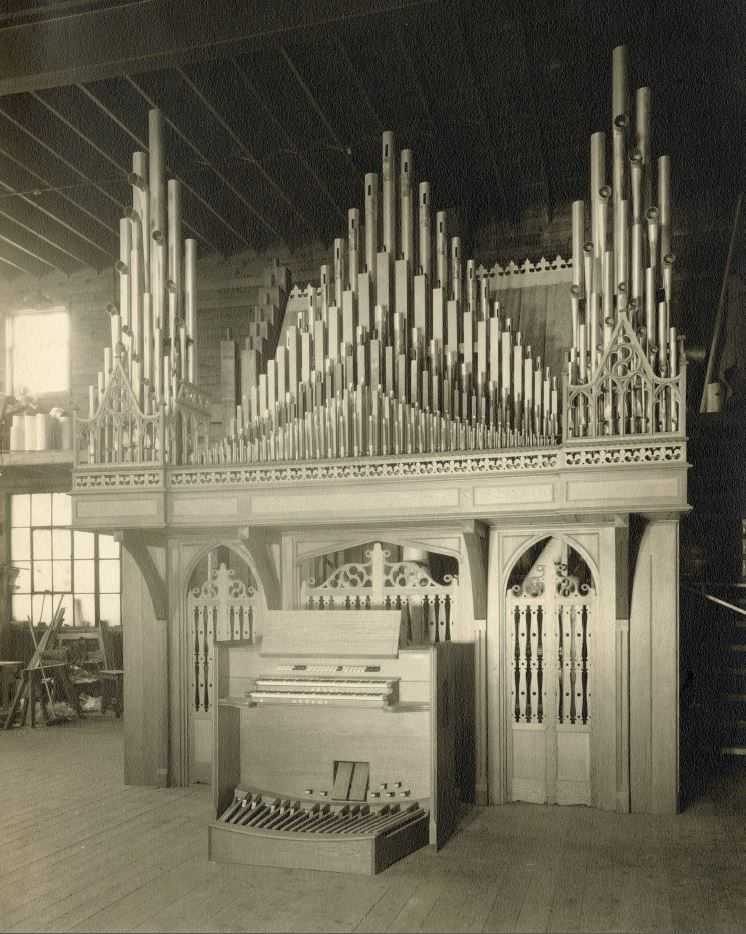
St. John's Roman Catholic Church

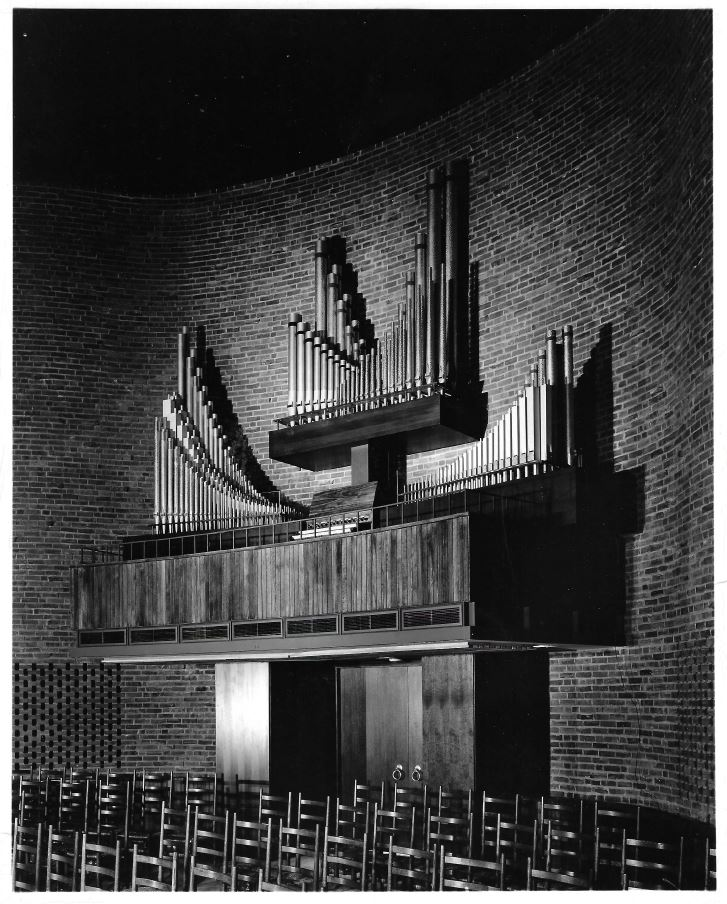
MIT Chapel

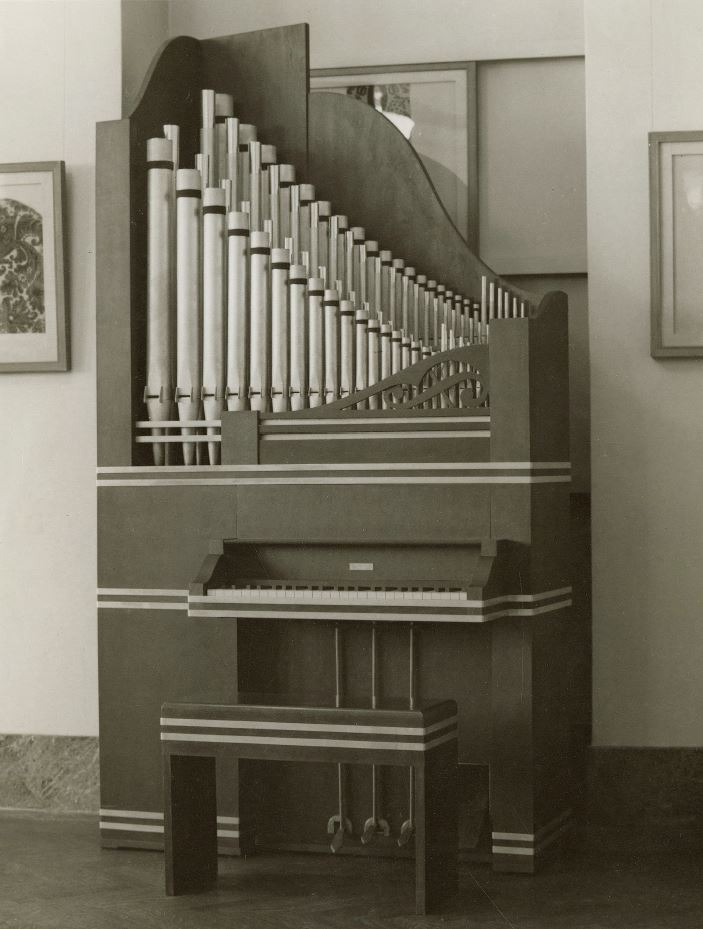
Portative Organ

== Walter "Chick" Holtkamp Jr. (1956–1995) ==
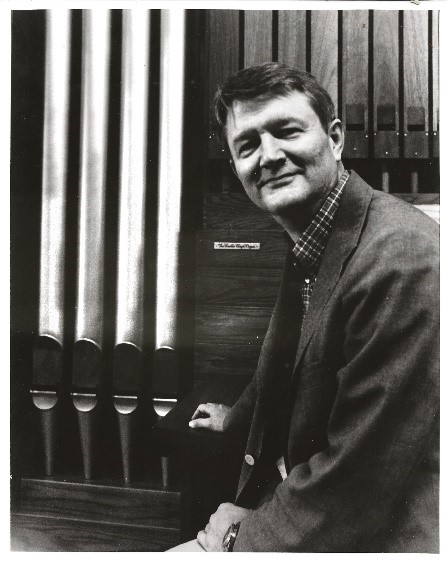
Walter "Chick" Holtkamp Jr., Company President from 1956 to 1995

Walter "Chick" Holtkamp joined the firm in 1956 after serving five years in the United States Navy. Upon his father's death in 1962 he became president of the company. Chick Holtkamp began his creative endeavors with work that reflected his father's. The chest actions were mixed pitman and electro-pneumatic slider. The visual designs were unenclosed, often with a strong horizontal element. The scaling and voicing focused on clarity and the rendering of polyphony. After taking over the shop in 1962 he began developing the chests and components necessary for building instruments with mechanical action. This process first happened in 1967 at St. John Lutheran Church in Summit, New Jersey. From this point on, the shop built instruments with both mechanical and electro-pneumatic action as the situation required. This combination continued until 1992. At that time, in recognition of the cost of re-leathering electro-pneumatic actions, Chick began developing his electric slider action. This relied upon the tried-and-true slider chest design that the company had built for the past twenty-five years. The tonal pallet of his work maintained its focus on the music and the rendering of polyphony. However, his particular emphasis gradually evolved to put greater emphasis on the free and singing quality of the voicing, and the organ's ability to lead the congregation. This was accompanied by a gradual increase in the overall amount of fundamental. As time passed the Positive gradually gave way to the Choir, all the while focusing on a blending, ensemble style of voicing which worked equally well with the congregation, choirs, and instrumentalists.

It was Chick's belief that the future of the pipe organ was not entirely in the past. Taking a proactive approach, in 1983 Chick founded the Holtkamp/AGO Competition in Organ Composition to encourage composers to write for the instrument. Following this in 1987, Chick brought together many of the premier American improvisers for a meeting in New York City. It was this meeting and the work that followed which gave rise to the first AGO Competition in Organ Improvisation at the 1990 National Convention in Boston, Massachusetts. Both competitions continue to this day.

In visual design, Chick made a tremendous impact on American organ building. His exposed designs, which were reminiscent of his father's work, had unmatched, three dimensional sculptural qualities. Rather than stay with the tried and true, and in conjunction with the ever increasing demand for mechanical action organs, he began developing a style of encased organ design.

=== List of organs ===
- Randolph Macon Women's College (1969; Lynchburg, Virginia)
- The University of Alabama Moody Music Building Concert Hall (1987; Tuscaloosa, Alabama)
- All Souls Unitarian Church (1989; New York, New York)
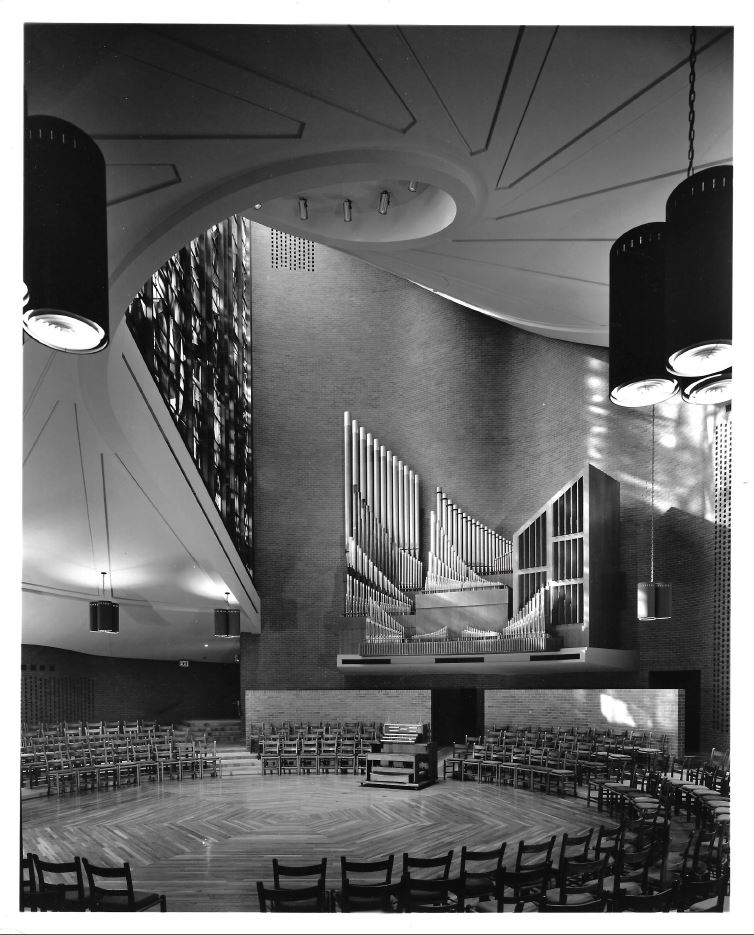
Randolph Macon Women's College

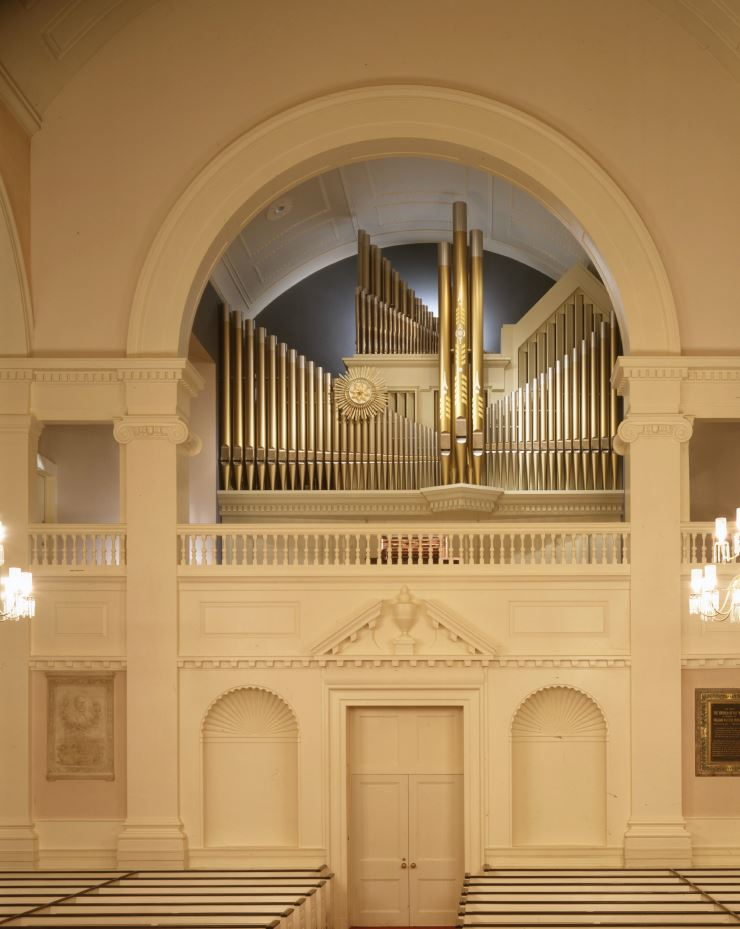
All Souls Unitarian Church

== F. Christian Holtkamp (since 1986) ==
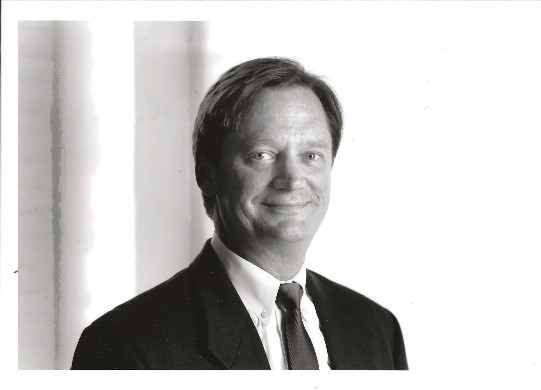
Christian Holtkamp, President of Holtkamp Organ Company

F. Christian (Chris) Holtkamp joined the shop in 1987 and became president of the Holtkamp Organ Company in 1995 following the retirement of his father. From the beginning of his time at the shop, Chris continued the development of tonal and visual design begun by Chick. His visual designs are entirely contextual, always taking great pains to match the visual design of the organ to the room in which it is installed. In tonal design his instruments contain the same ensemble voicing of Walter and Chick, but the internal balance of each instrument has changed to have a more even balance from treble to bass. This results in an ensemble which is full, rich, and embracing, without being overbearing. The shop builds electric slider, electro-pneumatic, and tracker actions.

=== List of organs ===
- Pilgrim Christian Church (1992; Chardon, Ohio)
- Bethlehem Lutheran Church (1999; Aberdeen, South Dakota)
- John Knox Presbyterian Church (2000; Greenville, South Carolina)
- Cathedral of St. Louis King of France (2004, 2008; New Orleans, Louisiana)
- St. Olaf College (2006; Northfield, Minnesota)
- Hungars Episcopal Church (2013; Machipongo, Virginia)
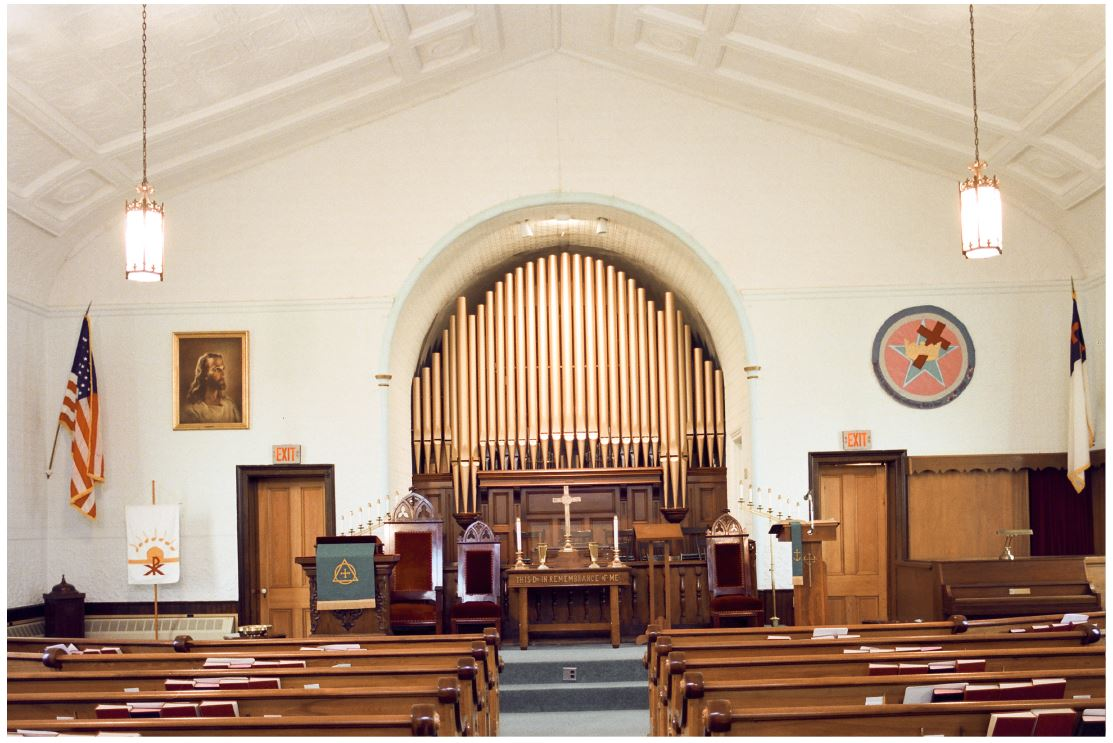
Pilgrim Christian Church

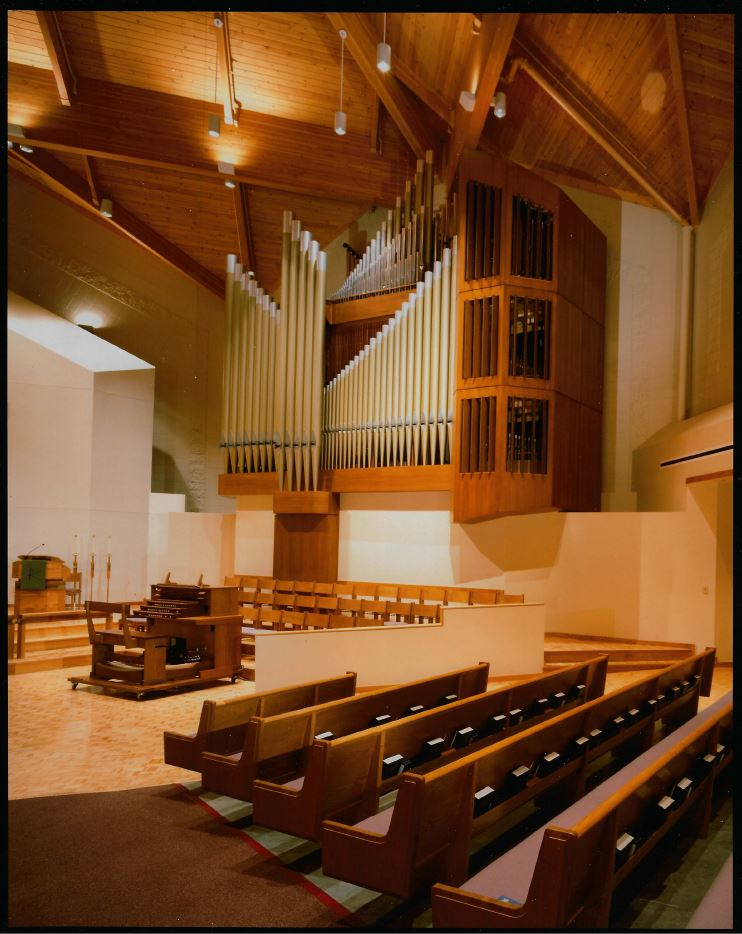
Bethlehem Lutheran Church

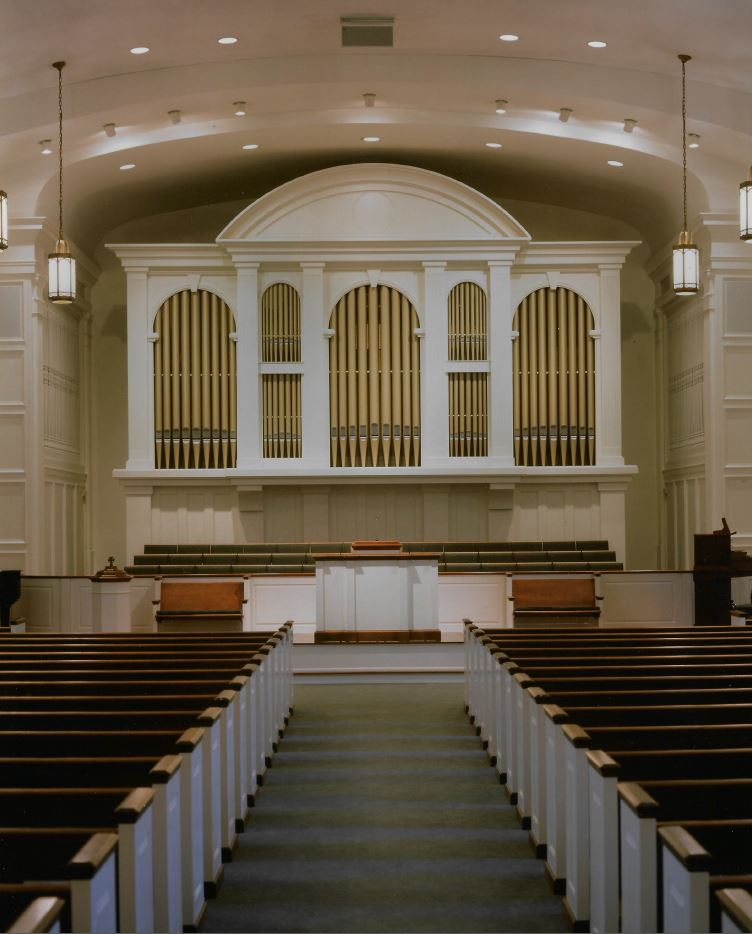
John Knox Presbyterian Church

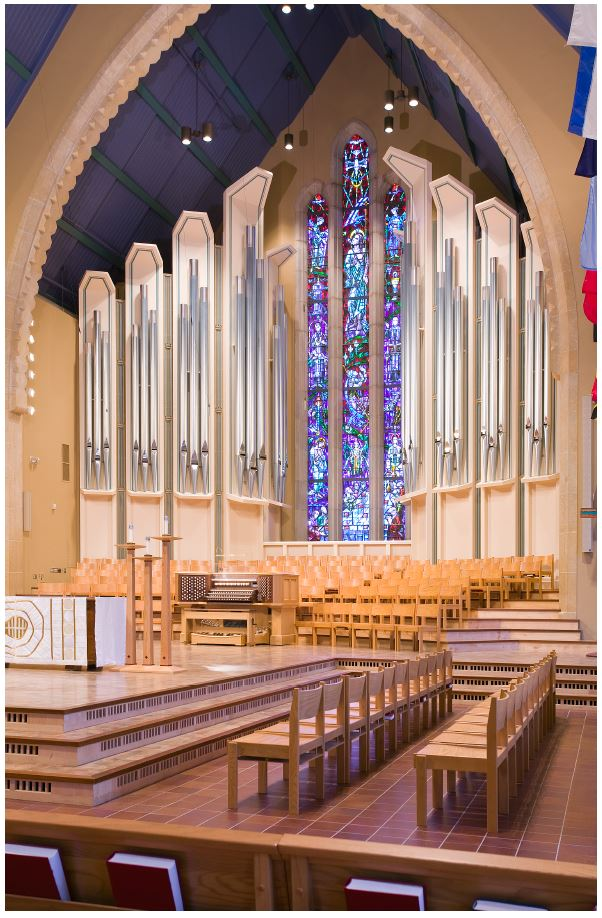
St. Olaf College

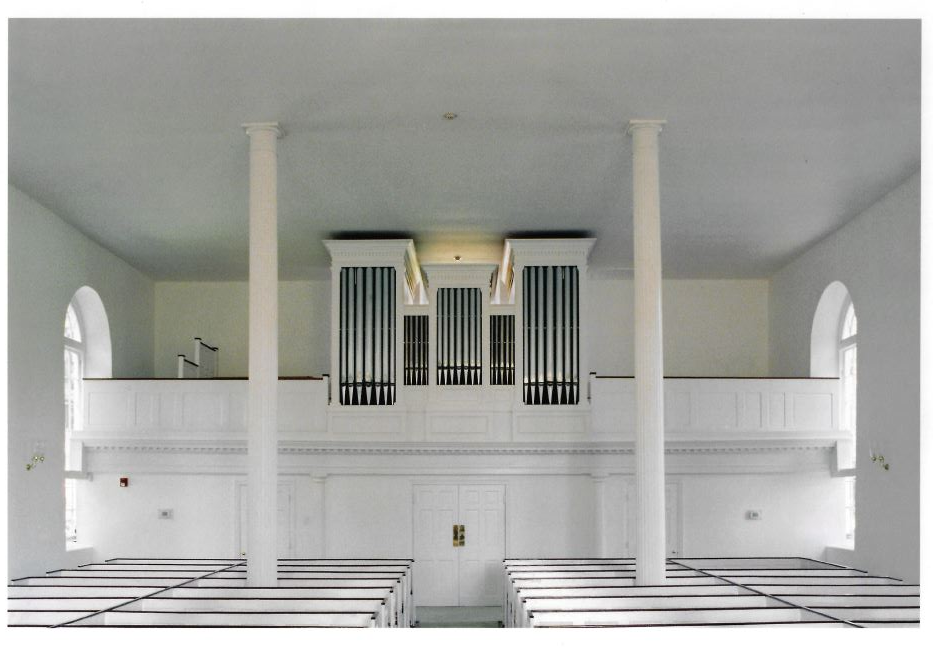
Hungars Episcopal Church

== See also ==
- List of pipe organ builders
