= Electromechanical organ =

Electromechanical organ can mean:

- A pipe organ with electro-pneumatic action
- An electric organ such as the Hammond organ which uses electromechanical tone generators
