= Kresge Auditorium =

Venue at the Massachusetts Institute of Technology

Coordinates: 42.35812°N 71.09507°W

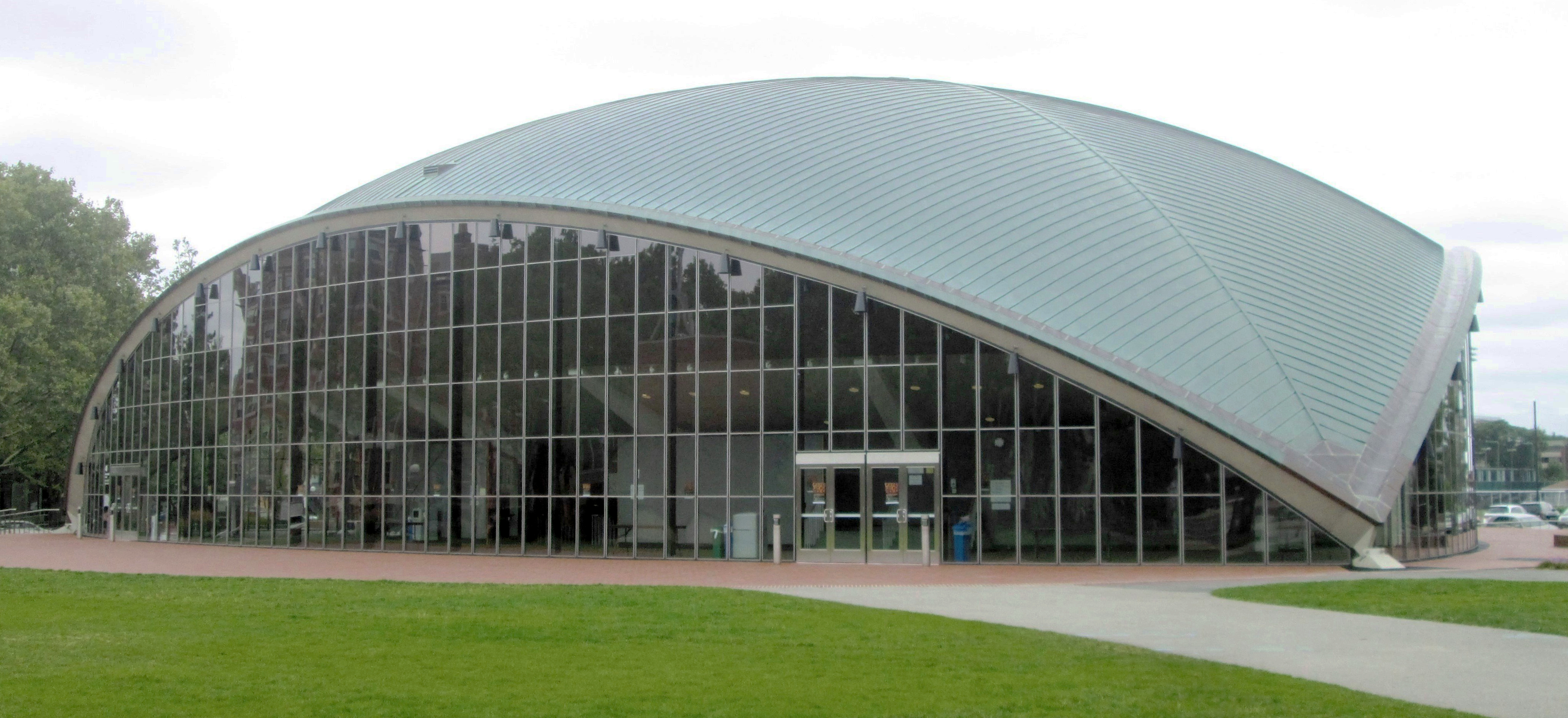
Kresge Auditorium (2017)

Kresge Auditorium (MIT Building W16) is an auditorium structure at the Massachusetts Institute of Technology, located at 48 Massachusetts Avenue, Cambridge, Massachusetts. It was designed by the Finnish-American architect Eero Saarinen, with ground-breaking in 1953 and dedication in 1955. The building was named for its principal funder, Sebastian S. Kresge, founder of S. S. Kresge Stores (corporate predecessor of Kmart) and the Kresge Foundation.

== Architectural context ==
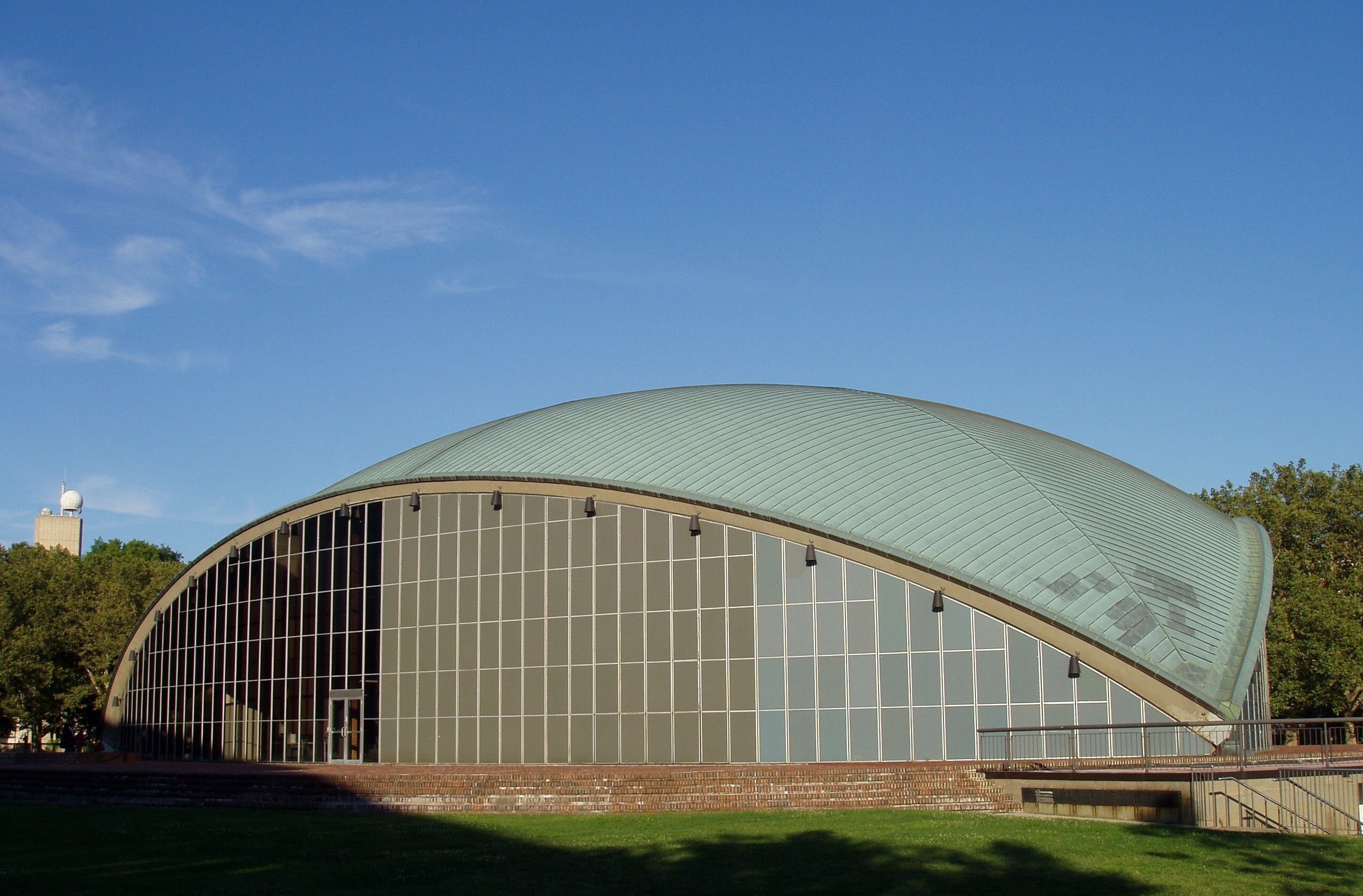
Kresge Auditorium from rear, looking toward I. M. Pei's Green Building tower at far left

Saarinen designed Kresge Auditorium in tandem with his nearby MIT Chapel; the two buildings are separated by a green space called the Kresge Oval. The ensemble is recognized as one of the best examples of mid-century modern architecture in the United States.

Though unassuming by today's standards, the buildings were part of an attempt to define MIT's social cohesion. The Auditorium was where MIT students and faculty could gather for formal events, and the Chapel was intended for marriages and memorials; the green that stretches between the two buildings, in the tradition of early-American urban planning, was to serve as the setting for civic events. Though the campus has grown around the buildings, the essential features of this idea are still easily legible, and the original intentions are reflected in the everyday actual usage of these spaces.

== Structure ==
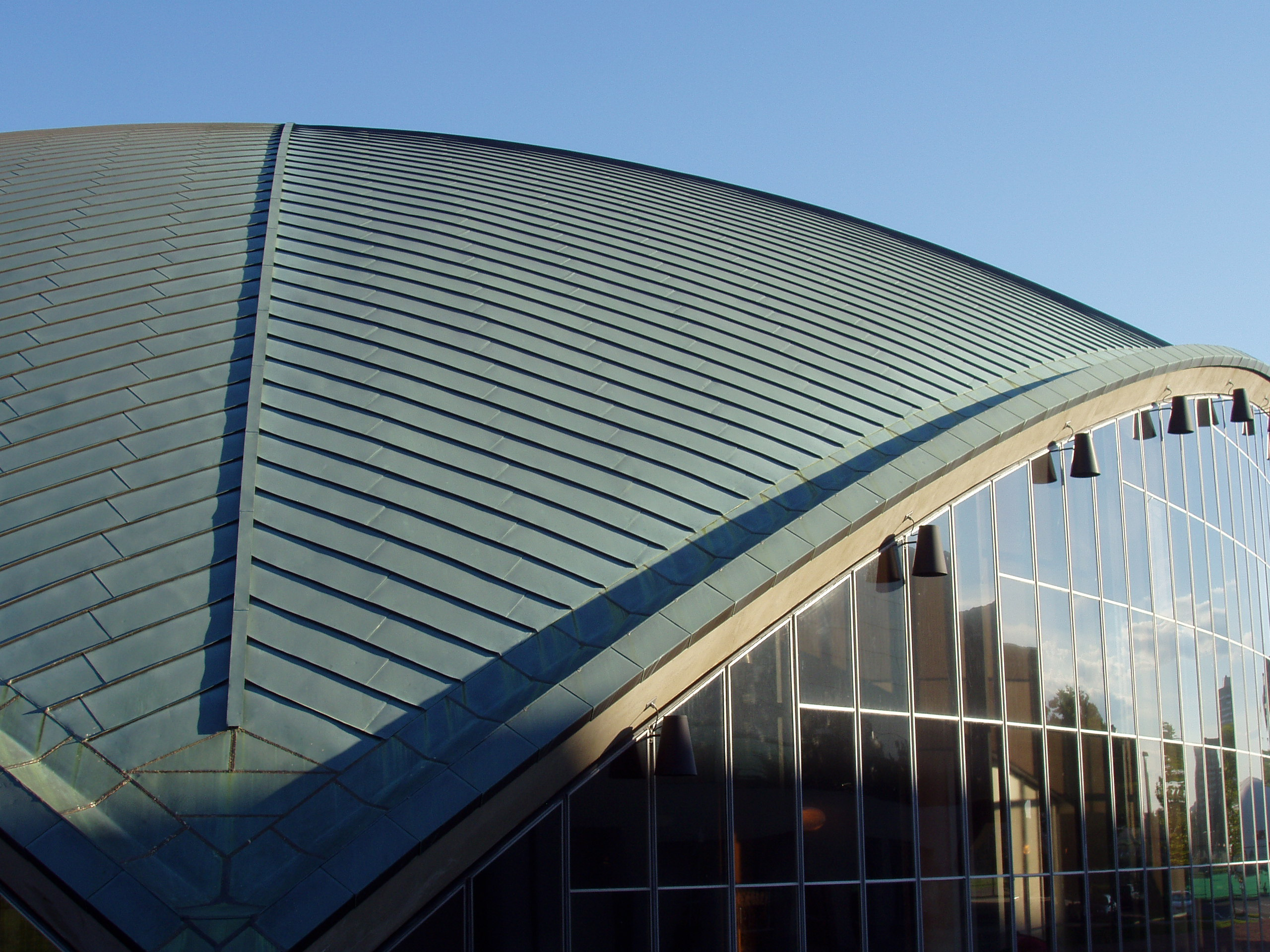
Roof detail and glass curtain wall

The auditorium is defined by an elegant thin-shell structure of reinforced concrete, one-eighth of a sphere rising to a height of 50 feet (15 m), and sliced away by sheer glass curtain walls so that it comes to earth on only three points. Thin-shelled concrete technology was innovative for the times; the dome is proportionately thinner than an eggshell. The dome weighs only 1,200 short tons (1,100 t) and it is clad with copper. It was originally covered with smooth, bright orastone which was then replaced with lead sheeting attached with stainless steel wires. The dome was originally supported only at the three corners, In 1980, cracks were found in the structure and the auditorium was closed immediately for repairs. Copper replaced the lead at that time, and the walls now carry part of the roof load.

Sitting on a circular red brick platform, the dome contains a concert hall (with seating for 1,226 people), plus a lower level that houses a small theater (seating 177), two rehearsal rooms, dressing rooms, offices, bathrooms, and lounges. The main stage is paneled with warm-colored vertical wood elements that echo the vertical glass panels of the building's facade. The concert hall also contains a Holtkamp acoustic pipe organ, whose pipes visually resonate as a sequence of vertical elements of varying heights. The opening ceremony in 1955 featured that organ, including a piece of music that was commissioned for the event, Aaron Copland's Canticle of Freedom.

== Concert hall acoustics ==
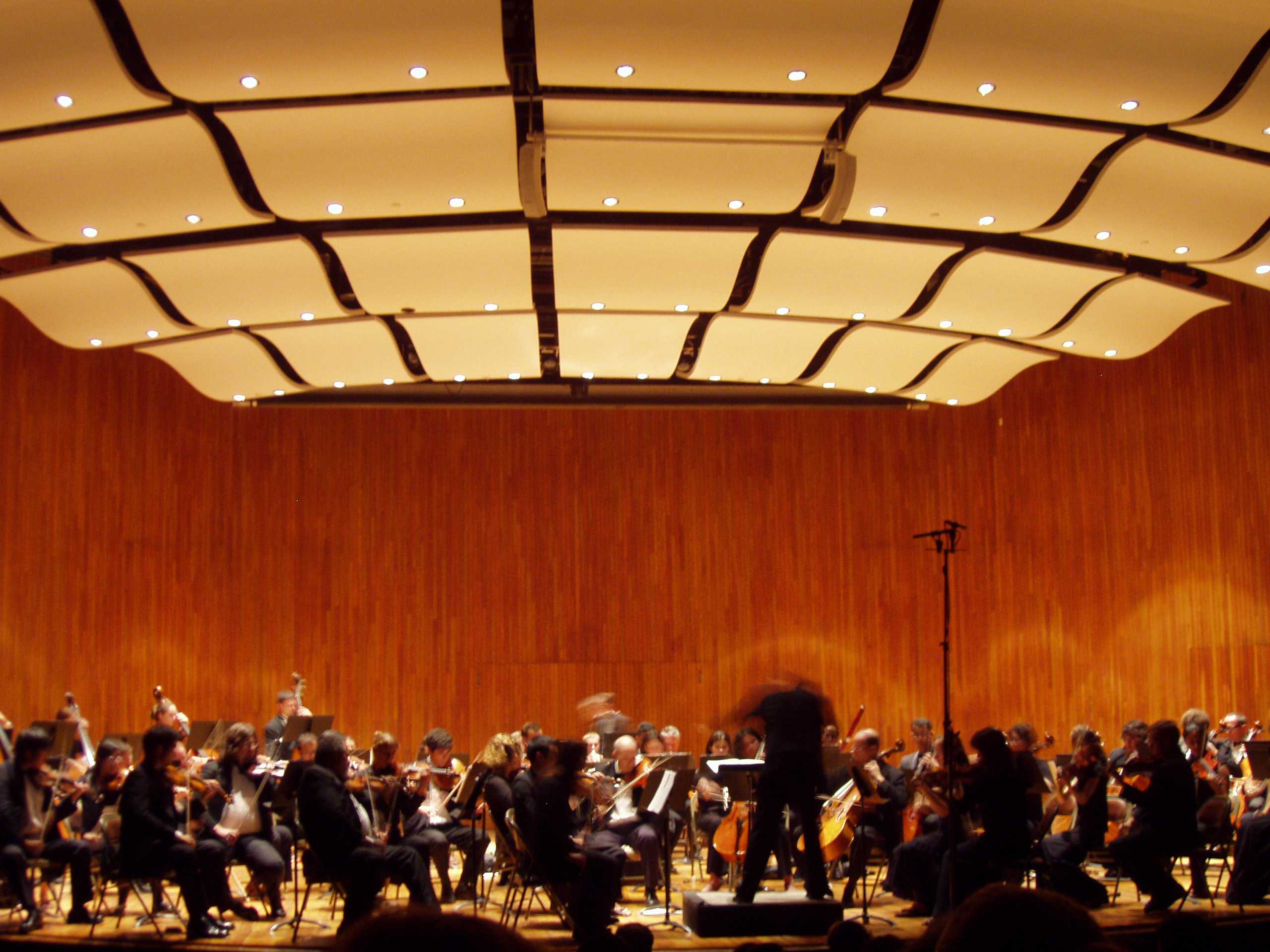
Interior view, with the MIT Summer Philharmonic Orchestra

Every seat in the concert hall has an unobstructed view, since there are no interior supports for the overarching dome. Working with acoustical architects Bolt, Beranek and Newman, architect Saarinen employed free-hanging acoustic "clouds" that absorb and direct sound, instead of a traditional plaster ceiling. These clouds also contain lights, loudspeakers, and ventilation.

There is excellent acoustic isolation between the main auditorium and the Kresge Little Theater directly below it. Performances can occur simultaneously in the two spaces, without interference. For many decades, the Little Theater was the primary on-campus small performance space for theatrical productions, and was heavily overscheduled. With the 2018 opening of a new performance arts building (W97, 345 Vassar St) at the far western end of campus, many more spaces are available for shows and supporting logistic operations, such as set design and construction. The Kresge Little Theater will continue to be used as well.

While standing on either side of the Kresge entry lobby, one can distinctly hear people on the other side speaking in as low a voice as a whisper. This so-called whispering gallery effect is produced by the curved geometrical shape and hard surfaces of the ceiling.

The first professional recording at the Kresge Auditorium was a performance by soloist James Stagliano on the French horn, playing Mozart's 4 Concerti for Horn, accompanied by the Zimbler Sinfonietta. The recording was made using a single Telefunken microphone, positioned 10 feet (3.0 m) from the concert platform, and recorded on an Ampex tape recorder. The performance was released on LP under the "Boston Records" label.

== See also ==
- Architecture of the Massachusetts Institute of Technology
- Centre des nouvelles industries et technologies
- Eero Saarinen buildings and structures
- Kresge Auditorium at Interlochen Center for the Arts
- List of concert halls
- MIT Chapel
- Shell (structure) & List of thin-shell structures
