= Diamond chair =

Chair designed by Harry Bertoia in 1952

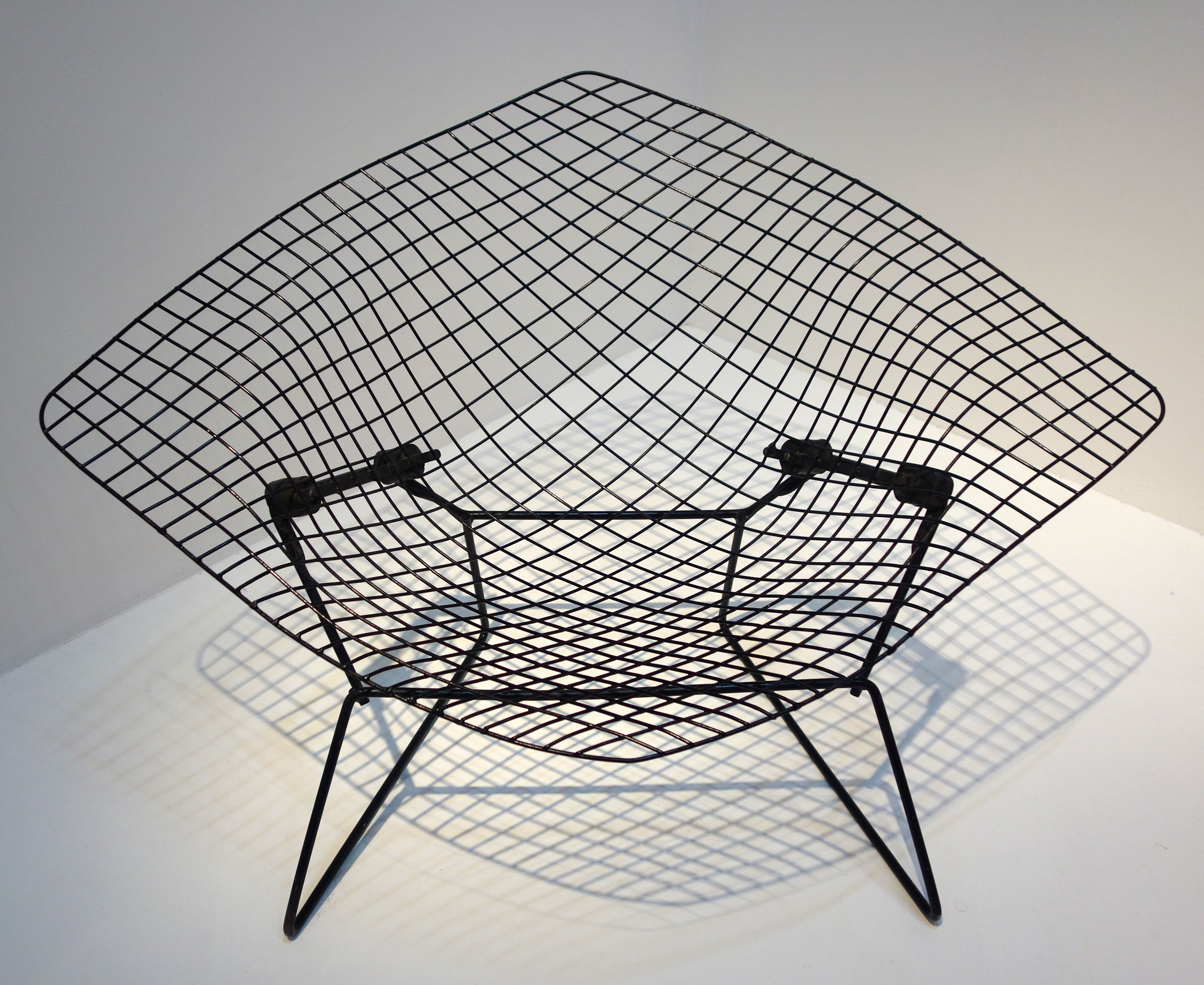
Diamond Chair

The Diamond Chair is a chair designed by Harry Bertoia in 1952.

Diamond chair is made with welded steel with rods in polished or satin chrome, or bonded rilsan, a very durable adhesive-fused nylon-dipped finish. Scratch, chip, and chemical resistant. All wire seating includes glides. Cushions are secured to the chair with lock snaps. Full covers are stretched over the wire seat basket and attach to the seat basket with hooks.

Bertoia said about the chairs: "They are mainly made of air, like sculpture. Space passes right through them."

== Bibliography ==
- Charlotte Fiell, Peter Fiell (2005). 1000 Chairs. Taschen. pp. 254–255. ISBN 3-8228-4103-X.
