= Harry Bertoia =

Italian-American artist and designer (1915–1978)

- Born: March 10, 1915; San Lorenzo, near Pordenone, Kingdom of Italy
- Died: November 6, 1978 (aged 63); Barto, Pennsylvania, U.S.
- Citizenship: Italy, USA
- Education: Cranbrook Academy of Art
- Spouse: Brigitta Valentiner
- Children: Son Val; two daughters, Lesta and Celia

Signature
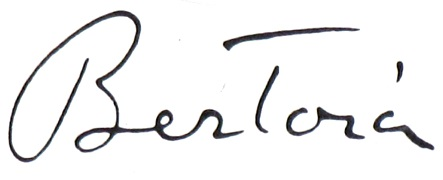

Untitled stainless steel wires set in artist's concrete base with aluminum trim by Harry Bertoia, 1965, Hirshhorn Museum and Sculpture Garden (Washington, D. C.)

Harry Bertoia (March 10, 1915 – November 6, 1978), son of Giuseppe Antonio Bertoia and Maria Secunda Mussio, was an Italian-born American artist, sound art sculptor, and modern furniture designer.

== Early life and education ==
Bertoia was born March 10, 1915 in San Lorenzo d'Arzene, Pordenone, Italy, about 50 miles north of Venice and 70 miles south of the Austrian border. "Arri" Bertoia, had one older brother, Oreste, and one younger sister, Ave. Ada, another sister, died as an infant of eighteen months old; she was the subject of one of his first paintings.

Until Grade 5, Arri, nicknamed Arieto (little Arri), went to school in nearby Arzene, Carsara. By the time he was a teenager his art teacher told Arri's parents that Arri needed further training.

At age 15, given the opportunity to move to Detroit, Harry chose to adventure to America and live with his older brother, Oreste. Upon arrival to the United States, his name Arri was americanized to Harry. After learning English and the bus schedule, he enrolled in Cass Technical High School, where he studied art and design and learned the skill of handmade jewelry making ca.1930–1936. At that time, there were three jewelry and metals teachers Louise Green, Mary Davis, and Greta Pack. In 1936 he attended the Art School of the Detroit Society of Arts and Crafts, now known as the College for Creative Studies.

The following year in 1937 he received a scholarship to study at the Cranbrook Academy of Art where he encountered Walter Gropius, Edmund N. Bacon, Ray and Charles Eames, and Florence Knoll for the first time. At the time Cranbrook was an eclectic fusion of creativity. Many now famous artists and designers such as Carl Milles, resident-sculptor, Maija Grotell, resident-ceramist, the Saarinen family and others were enticed to participate as teachers at the school. Students were encouraged to seek their passion rather than receiving a degree.

== Career ==
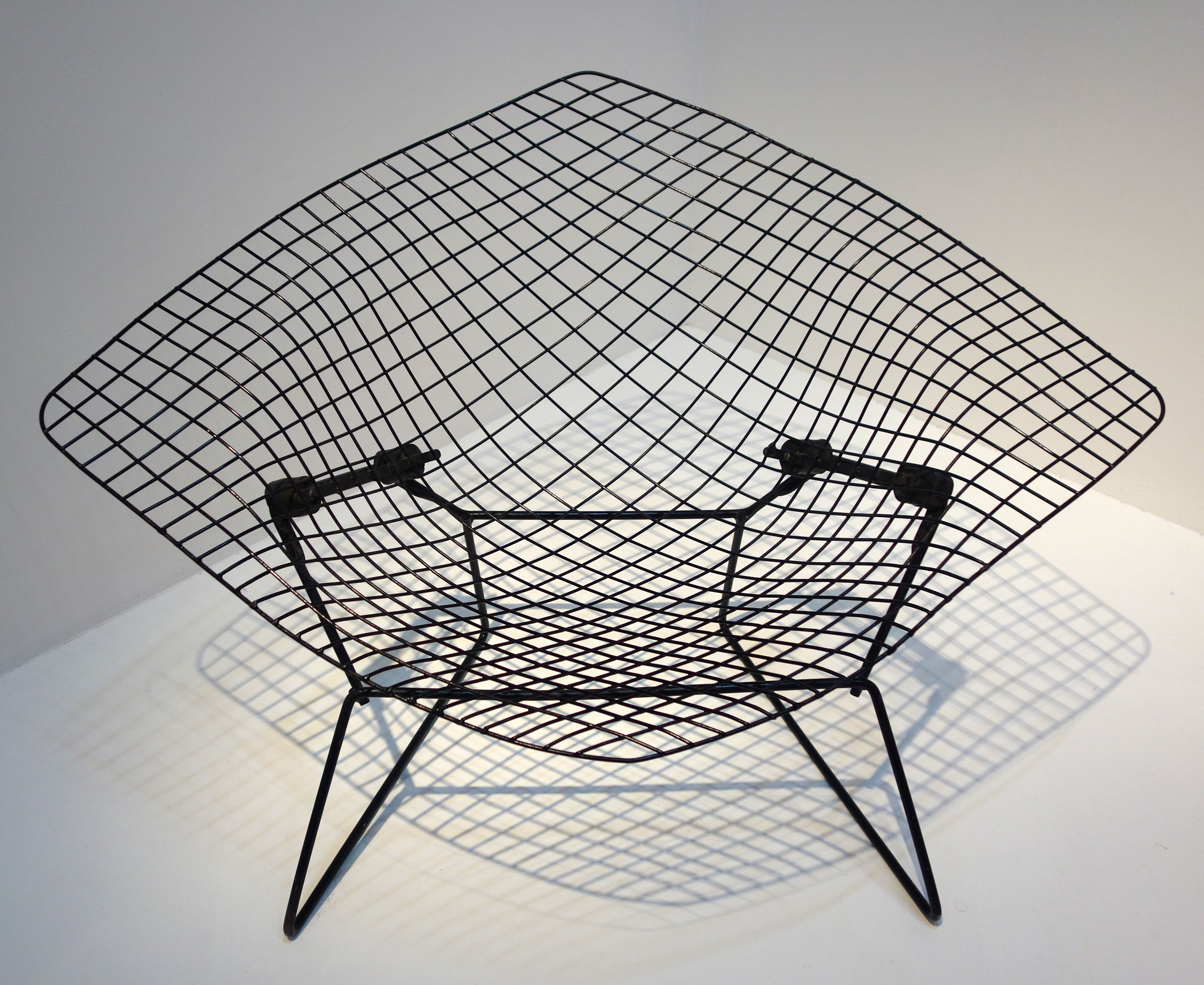
Diamond chair designed for Knoll (Musée National d'Art Moderne, Paris)

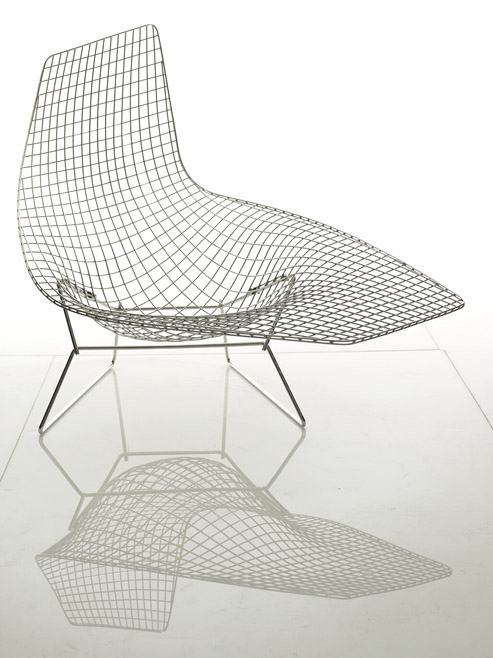
Asymmetrical chair designed for Knoll

Starting out as a painting student but soon after asked by Eliel Saarinen, Director of the Cranbrook, to reopen the metal workshop in 1939, Bertoia taught jewelry design and metal work. As the war effort made metal a rare and very expensive commodity he began to focus his efforts on jewelry making, even designing and creating wedding rings for Ray Eames and Edmund Bacon's wife Ruth.

When all the metal was taken up by war efforts, he became the graphics instructor. In his after hours time he experimented with different printing methods, developing a series of prints he called monotypes. Being uninterested in the traditional duplication of graphics prints led Bertoia to the use of movable plates and hand embellishments, separating one print from another via a series of flexible forms. These prints of the 1940s are regarded as some of his most creative graphics. While searching for a critical analysis of these prints, he sent 100 of them to Hilla Rebay, director and curator of the Museum of Non-Objective Painting, later known as the Solomon R. Guggenheim Museum in New York city. Rebay responded by asking for the prices of the monotypes; to Bertoia's surprise she purchased dozens of them, some for herself as well as for the museum totaling about $1000.00. She offered Bertoia praise and encouragement. Subsequently the museum exhibited 19 of these prints in 1943; in this show Harry had the most works of any artist there, including works by Moholy-Nagy, Werner Drewes and Charles Smith.

While working and studying at Crandon, Harry met Brigitta Valentiner, the daughter of Wilhelm Valentiner, Director of the Detroit Institute of Arts in 1940. Besides being the foremost expert on Rembrandt in the U.S., Wilhelm Valentiner was acquainted with many European modernists such as Paul Klee, Wassily Kandinsky, and Joan Miró. He introduced Harry to all these artists and more, which had a profound influence on Harry.

Still at Cranbrook, in 1943 Harry married Brigitta Valentiner, and then they moved to California where he went to work for Charles and Ray at the Molded Plywood Division of the Evans Product Company. Bertoia also learned welding techniques at Santa Monica College and began experimenting with sound sculptures. He worked there until 1946, then sold his jewelry and monotypes until obtaining work with the Electronics Naval Lab in La Jolla. In 1950, he was invited to move to Pennsylvania to work with Hans and Florence Knoll. (Florence had also studied at Cranbrook and remembered Bertoia.) Knoll acquired an old leaky garage for Harry to set up shop in Bally, PA. During this period he designed five wire pieces that became known as the Bertoia Collection for Knoll. Among these was the famous diamond chair, a fluid, sculptural form made from a welded lattice work of steel. The chairs became part of the “modern” furniture movement of the 1950s, later to be referred to as Midcentury Modern.

In Bertoia's own words, "If you look at these chairs, they are mainly made of air, like sculpture. Space passes right through them."

The chairs were produced with varying degrees of upholstery over their light grid-work, and they were handmade at first because a suitable mass production process could not be found. Unfortunately, the chair edge utilized two thin wires welded on either side of the mesh seat. This design had been granted a patent to the Eames for the wire chair produced by Herman Miller. Herman Miller eventually won and Bertoia & Knoll redesigned the seat edge, using a thicker, single wire, and grinding down the edge of the seat wires at a smooth angle—the same way the chairs are still produced. Nonetheless, the commercial success enjoyed by Bertoia's diamond chair was immediate. It was only in 2005 that Bertoia's asymmetrical chaise longue was introduced at the Milan Furniture Fair and sold out immediately.

== Sound sculpture ==
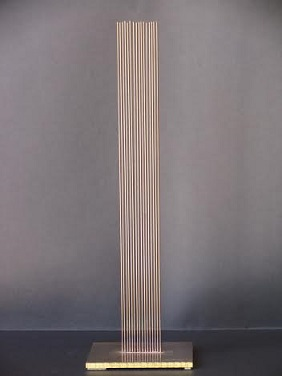
Sound Sculpture

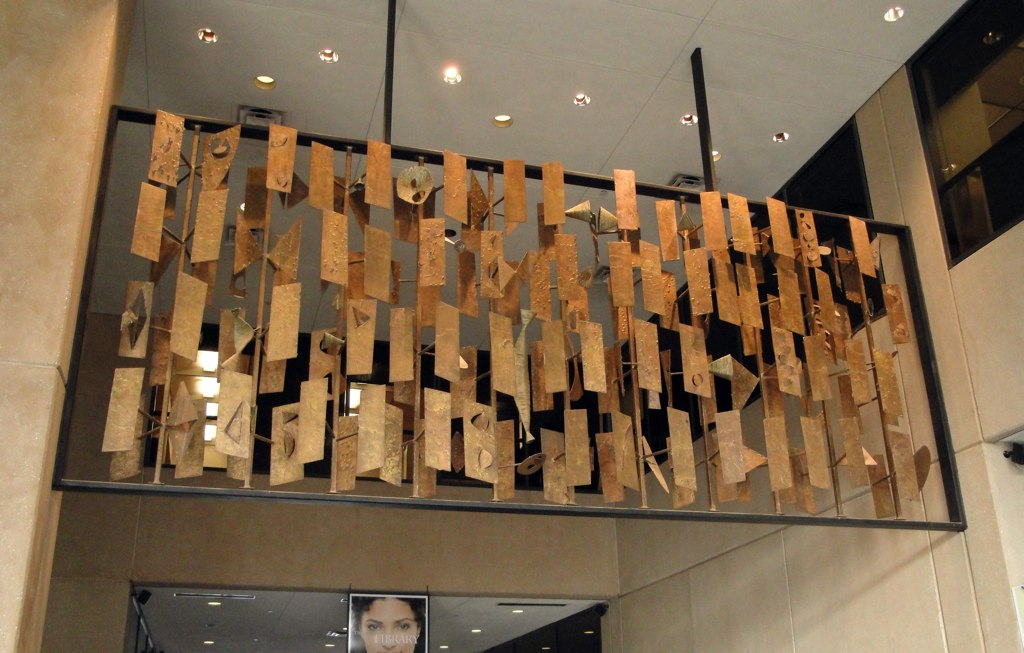
Bertoia's "Textured Screen" caused much controversy when it was unveiled for the Dallas Public Library in 1954.

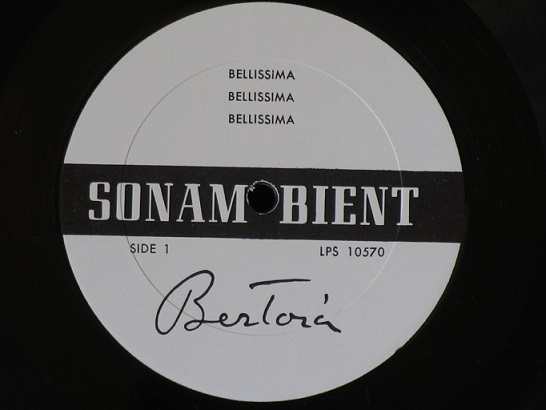
Sonambient record label showing Harry Bertoia's signature

By the mid-1950s, the chairs being produced by Knoll sold so well that the lump sum payment arrangement from Knoll allowed Bertoia to devote himself exclusively to sculpture and put a down payment on the 18th century Barto farmhouse he had been renting. With the help of his Cranbrook friend architect Eero Saarinen, Harry's first architectural sculpture commission was in 1953 for the General Motors Technical Center. He ultimately produced over 50 commissioned public sculptures, many of which remain viewable. One of those was a sculpture created in 1955, commissioned by Eero Saarinen: the altar piece in the Massachusetts Institute of Technology Chapel.

Bertoia recounts how the first Sound Sculpture came about by chance: “I accidentally struck one rod when I wanted to bend it,” The sound echoed in my mind for a very long time." This started a search to understand "what a group of wires would do."

In the 1960s, he began experimenting with sounding sculptures of tall vertical rods on flat bases. He renovated the old barn into an atypical concert hall and put in about 100 of his favorite "Sonambient" sculptures. Bertoia played the pieces in a number of concerts and even produced a series of eleven albums, all entitled "Sonambient," of the music made by his art, manipulated by his hands along with the elements of nature. In the late 1990s, his daughter found a large collection of near mint condition original albums stored away on his property in Pennsylvania. These were sold as collector's items. In 2015, these Sonambient recordings were re-issued by Important Records as a box set with a booklet of the history and previously unseen photos.

The sound sculptures are also featured on a 1975 record titled "The Sounds of Sound Sculpture".

Bertoia's work can be found in The Addison Gallery of American Art (Andover, Massachusetts), the Brooklyn Museum (New York City), the Cleveland Museum of Art, the Dallas Public Library, the Detroit Institute of Arts, the Hirshhorn Museum and Sculpture Garden (Washington D.C.), the Honolulu Museum of Art, the Kemper Museum of Contemporary Art (Kansas City, Missouri), the Nasher Sculpture Center (Dallas, Texas), the Philadelphia Museum of Art, the Reading Public Museum (Reading, Pennsylvania), the Allentown Art Museum, Milwaukee Art Museum, the Smithsonian American Art Museum (Washington D.C.), the Vero Beach Museum of Art (Vero Beach, Florida), and the Walker Art Center (Minneapolis, Minnesota).

Bertoia's "Sunburst Sculpture" owned by the Joslyn Art Museum was originally installed in the Joslyn's Fountain Court. It is now located in the lobby of the Milton R. Abrahams Branch of the Omaha Public Library. Lord Palumbo owns several Bertoia works which are on display at Kentuck Knob. Bertoia's "Sounding Sculpture" can be found in the plaza of The Aon Center, Chicago's fourth-tallest building. Another "Sounding Sculpture", considerably smaller than the one mentioned above, is featured in the Rose Terrace of the Chicago Botanic Garden, and a third very similar to the piece in Chicago called "Sounding Piece" was until 2003 on display at the Herbert F. Johnson Museum of Art at Cornell University in Ithaca, New York. The Herbert F Johnson Museum has 29 Bertoias of sculpture and print in its collection. As explained in October 3, 1995 piece in the weekly "Dear Uncle Ezra" column of the university newspaper:

Dear Uncle Ezra,

What is that sound coming from the Johnson Museum? It's a pingy type sound that I guess could be some kind of wind chime but it seems like it's coming from the building itself.

— Just wondering

Dear Chiming In,

Well, it almost is coming from the building itself. What you hear is "Sounding Piece", a sculpture by Harry Bertoia that permanently resides on the sculpture court (outdoor balcony) on the second floor of the Johnson Museum. The chimes sway back and forth on tall rods and "ping" or "gong" into each other (depending on which chime and how hard they collide) when winds move them. It's one of my all-time favorites, well worth a visit if you haven't seen it. You can go out on to the sculpture court until at least the end of October. Once winter sets in, the chimes are secured so that they won't snap in the windy, icy weather.

Uncle Ezra

The sculpture was taken off view after it was damaged in a storm in 2003 . Audiovisual footage of many of Bertoia's sound sculptures can be viewed on websites such as YouTube.

== Other work ==
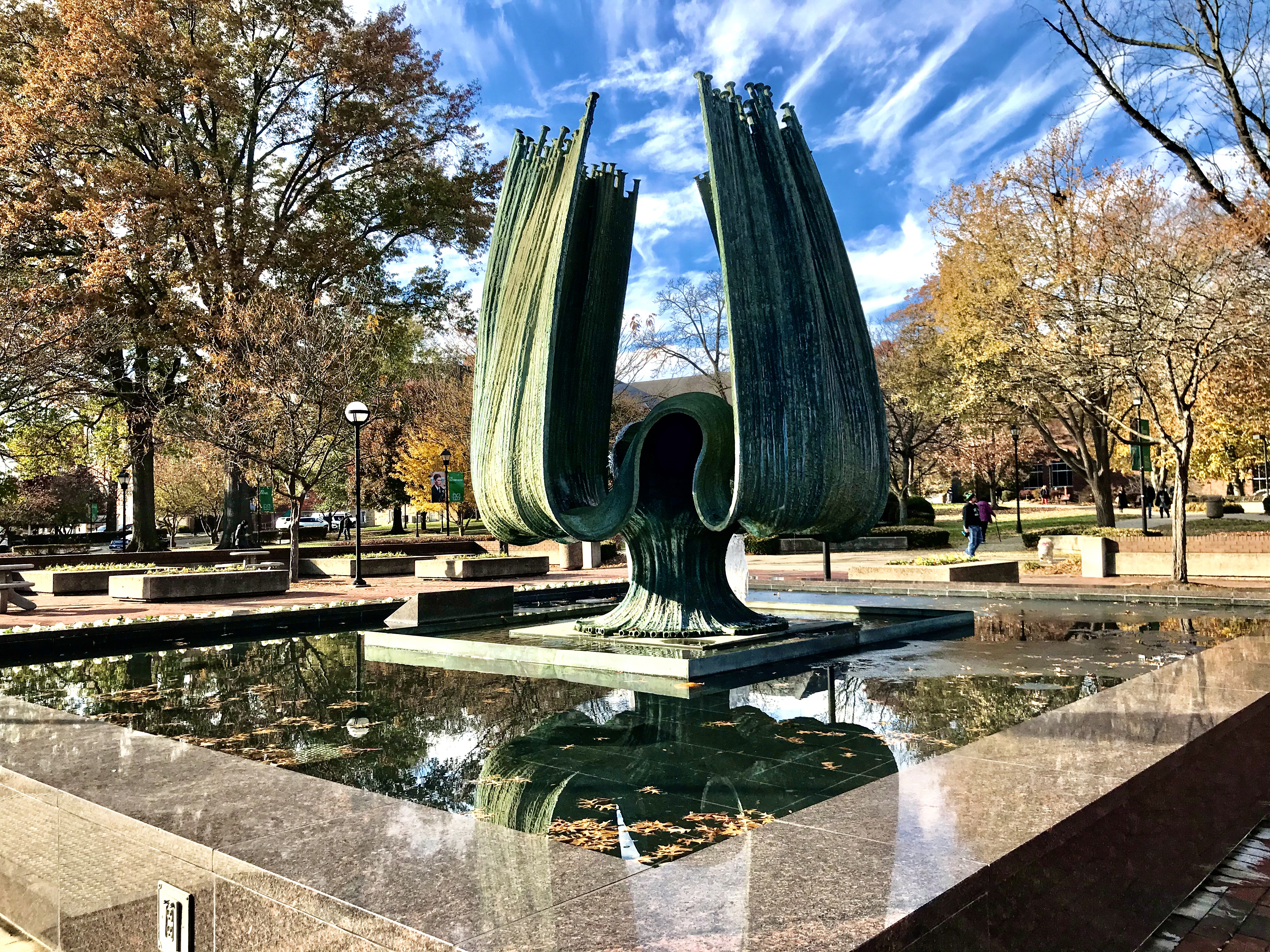
Marshall University Memorial Fountain in 2020.

Bertoia was the sculptor commissioned to create the Marshall University Memorial Fountain in Huntington, West Virginia, to honor the university's football team in the wake of the plane crash that killed them on November 14, 1970.

The 1954 Gordon Bunshaft building for Manufacturer's Hanover Trust, now JPMorgan Chase (510 Fifth Avenue at West 43rd Street, New York City) included a full building-width, second-floor screen-sculpture by Bertoia. It was dismantled and removed in 2010 by J. P. Morgan Chase. At some point after 2011, the screen-sculpture was re-installed on the second floor, where it is now on view. Since October 2016, this location is the global flagship for The North Face, a California-based outdoor lifestyle brand.

Bertoia was also commissioned to make a screen sculpture for the Embassy of the United States in Caracas, Venezuela, in 1958. The building, located in the Chacao Municipality (former Sucre District), now serves as the headquarters of Venezuela's Ministry of the People's Power for Tourism, while the embassy was moved to a bigger site in Valle Arriba in 1995. Bertoia's sculpture, spanning the entire vertical length of the building, is still in place.

Harry's first European exhibit of his sculptural work took place at the US Pavilion of the 1958 Brussels World’s Fair, alongside Alexander Calder.

The 'Golden Sun' was commissioned in 1967 for The Whiting, an auditorium in Flint, Michigan. Seven feet in diameter, the spherical sculpture consists of 675 gold-plated stainless steel branches and hangs in the building's lobby.

In 2019, the Harry Bertoia Foundation launched a catalogue raisonné project, which seeks to document and research the diverse and extensive artistic practice of the artist.

== Missing sculpture rediscovered ==
December 2025 marked the major restoration and reinstallation of a 1970 masterwork by Bertoia in the atrium of General Motors’s new global headquarters in Detroit, Michigan. This event was announced by General Motors in December; the Detroit Free Press reported on the sculpture in January. Originally this piece was commissioned in 1970 by the J.L. Hudson Company for its anchor store at the Genesee Valley Mall, in Flint, Michigan. The Hudson Company wanted to create an artwork for the mall’s open court. The sculpture, a hanging piece 26-feett-tall "comprises two cloud-like aggregations of brazed steel rods—a technique Bertoia called “sunlit straw”—one suspended below the other."

In 1980, when the mall closed for renovations, the sculpture was moved to the Northland Mall, in the Detroit suburb of Southfield. It was never displayed and the Northland Mall was closed in 2015. The sculpture ended up in storage and literally forgotten for decades. In 2015 the city of Southfield paid $2.4 million for the defunct mall. City officials had no idea that Bertoia's sculpture was hiding in the basement. In 2017, when Terri Stearn and Jeffrey Lygon, both members of the Southfield Arts Commission at the time, went into the basement they were shocked to discover the sculpture sitting there, caked in dust.

“We had hard hats on, it was dirty, there was no electricity down there; we had flashlights,” as Stearn described it to the Detroit Free Press’ Duante Beddingfield. “I’m looking at this thing with [Lygon], and it’s corroded in dust. You can’t even knock the dust off; it’s been there for decades...I look at Jeff, and we both go, ‘Bertoia!’ at the same time.... We screamed, we were so excited—like kids in a candy store.” The city of Southfield held onto the piece, looking for a buyer.

General Motors announced in April 2024 that it planned to relocate its headquarters to Hudson’s Detroit. As it turned out, GM moving to this new downtown development is coincidentally the site of the former J.L. Hudson Company Department Store. Moreover, the department store is the same company that had commissioned the Bertoia sculpture in the first place, emphasizing the fact that GM also had ties to Bertoia.

Harry's very first sculpture commission in 1953 was with GM. At that time, the company had asked the artist to create Untitled Wall Screen, a 36-foot-long, 10-foot-tall piece made of hundreds of vertical rectangular steel plates coated in molten brass and bronze. It was Bertoia’s first public sculpture installation, taking up the entire western-facing wall of the Cadillac House at Vanderbilt, located at the General Motors Global Technical Center campus, in Warren, Michigan. It is still on view. Harry's school pal and architect Eero Saarinen who had designed the campus itself had connected Harry with GM.

“There are all these connections between the sculpture and Hudson and General Motors and Detroit,” Christo Datini, GM’s design archive and special collections manager, told the Detroit News. GM purchased the piece from the city for $1 million. It took more than a year for workers to clean and restore the piece to its former glory.

Installing the masterpiece turned into a serious challenge. A 15-foot-wide, 75-foot-tall opening in the side of the building had to be created by the construction team. The sculpture in two pieces then had to be carefully inserted using cranes. Illuminated by sunlight that pours in through the glass ceiling, now this sculpture hangs several floors above the ground.

The week of January 12, 2026, GM has planned to officially relocate to its new facility at Hudson's Detroit. The company plans to offer tours to the public as an opportunity to see this Bertoia sculpture. According to his daughter, Bertoia wanted this piece and his others to be open to each individual's interpretation. For herself, she said this piece reminds her of "something you'd find in the universe."

“When he came up with the ideas for various sculptures, especially one like this, he was really thinking in much larger terms than just our little planet Earth here.”

== Personal life ==
In 1943 Bertoia married fellow Cranbrook student Brigitta Valentiner (daughter of Wilhelm Valentiner, then director of the Detroit Institute of Arts). They had three children; a son, Val; two daughters, Lesta and Celia; two grandchildren, Eric and Fawni.

A persistent sore throat and laryngitis led to the diagnosis of cancer in 1977. As a result Bertoia was determined to finish works in progress and put everything in order. He had produced thousands of works of art including his tonal barn collection, a beautiful limited edition monotype book, and album covers for his upcoming Sonambient long play phonographic albums. He used his passion and energy to fuel his goal.

The toxic fumes emitted by his work materials unfortunately contributed to his lung cancer. According to his family, "his death was peaceful, he felt complete, and he finally accepted dying as simply one more transitional part of life." He died at his home in Barto, Pennsylvania, at age 63 on November 6, 1978.

His wife Brigitta died in 2007 shortly after her 87th birthday. Val and Lesta, two of his children, are artists themselves, while daughter Celia founded and directs the Harry Bertoia Foundation. Harry Bertoia is buried behind the Sonambient Barn in Pennsylvania beneath a huge 1-ton 10’ Bertoia double bronze gong.

== Publications ==
- Harry Bertoia: Sculptor (1970), June Kompass Nelson, Wayne State University Press, ISBN 0-8143-1402-3
- Harry Bertoia, Printmaker: Monotypes and Other Monographics (1989), June Kompass Nelson, Wayne State University Press, ISBN 0-8143-2063-5
- The World of Bertoia (2003), Nancy N. Schiffer and Val O. Bertoia, Schiffer Publishing, ISBN 0-7643-1798-9
- The Life and Work of Harry Bertoia (2015), Celia Bertoia, Schiffer Publishing, ISBN 978-0-7643-4693-4
