= MIT Chapel =

Non-denominational chapel in Massachusetts

Coordinates: 42°21′30″N 71°05′39″W

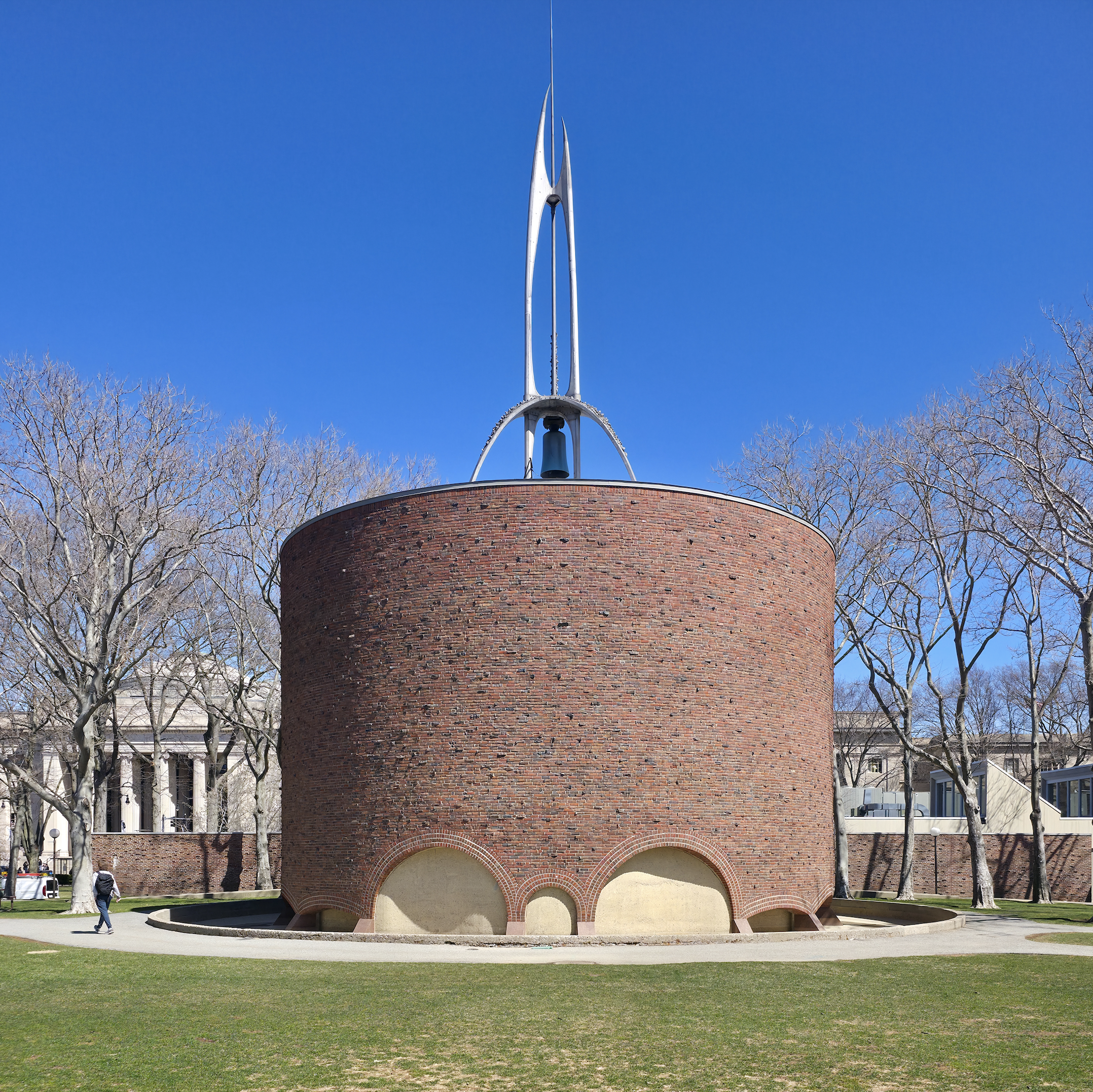
Exterior of the chapel

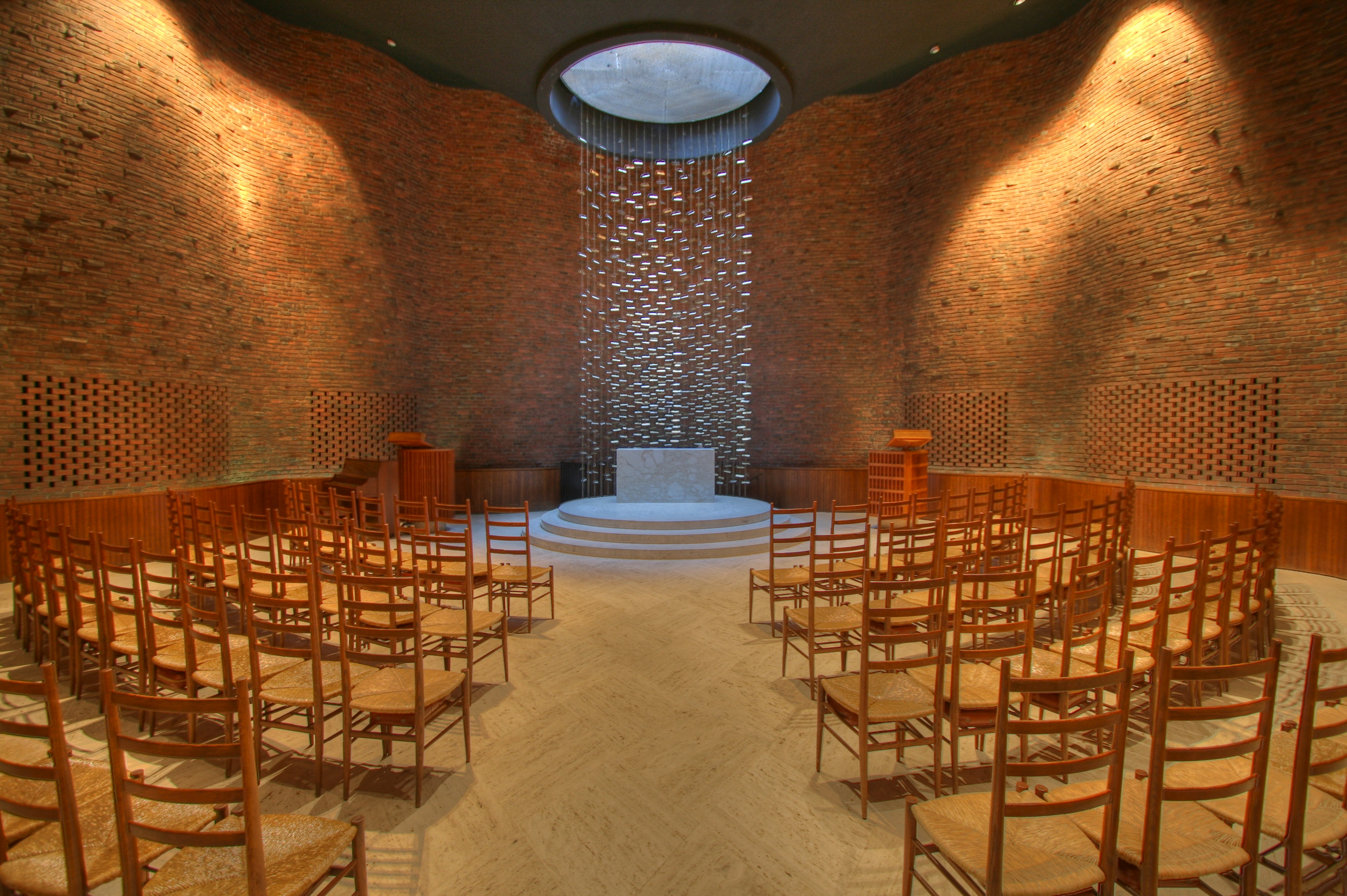
Interior of the chapel

The MIT Chapel (dedicated 1955, completed in 1956) is a non-denominational chapel designed by noted architect Eero Saarinen. It is located on the campus of the Massachusetts Institute of Technology in Cambridge, Massachusetts, next to Kresge Auditorium and the Kresge Oval, both of which Saarinen also designed. Though a small building, the Chapel is often noted as a successful example of mid-century modern architecture in the United States. Saarinen also designed the landscaping surrounding all three locations.

== Design ==
From the outside, the chapel is a simple, windowless brick cylinder set inside a very shallow concrete moat. It is 50 feet (15 m) in diameter and 30 feet (9.1 m) high, and topped by an aluminum spire. The brick is supported by a series of low arches. Saarinen chose bricks that were rough and imperfect to create a textured effect. The whole is set in two groves of London plane trees, with a long wall to the east, all designed by Saarinen. The wall and trees provide a uniform background for the chapel, and isolate the site from the noise and bustle of adjacent buildings.

Within is an intimate space, stunning in its immediate visual impact. Windowless interior walls are undulating brick. Like a cascade of light, a full-height metal sculpture by Harry Bertoia glitters from the circular skylight down to a small, unadorned marble altar. Natural light filters upward from shallow slits in the walls catching rippling reflected light from the moat; this dim ambient light is complemented by artificial lighting. The chapel's curving spire and bell tower were designed by the sculptor Theodore Roszak and added in 1956.

The chapel has an excellent pipe organ that was custom-designed for the space by Walter Holtkamp of the Holtkamp Organ Company, located in Cleveland, Ohio. Holtkamp was instrumental in the 1950s, in the revival of the classic school of organ-building. In May, 1970, the musician Ned Lagin performed an eight-channel, four-tape-recorder electronic music piece especially created for the chapel in the presence of Jerry Garcia, Phil Lesh and Mickey Hart. Although Hart passed out, Garcia and Lesh invited Lagin to join the Grateful Dead in California.

Leland M. Roth included the building in his History of American Architecture, using it to illustrate the contrast between Saarinen's approach and that of Mies van der Rohe (who designed a chapel for IIT). Roth said that "through the sheer manipulation of light and its focus on a blazingly white marble altar block, Saarinen created a place of mystic quiet".

== 2014 renovation ==
In the summer of 2014, MIT started the first comprehensive renovation of the Chapel since its original construction. The moat was rebuilt to repair leaks and to allow it to be refilled with water which is recirculated and filtered. The external envelope of the building was repaired, and internal restoration and improvements to mechanical systems were performed. The Chapel was reopened in 2015.

With the demolition of nearby Bexley Hall and its replacement by a landscaped garden, the MIT Chapel became more visible from Massachusetts Avenue for the first time. The renovations preserved the Chapel as a sanctuary of tranquility, just steps from the bustling 77 Massachusetts Avenue entrance to the Infinite Corridor, from Kresge Auditorium, and from the Stratton Student Center.

== See also ==
- Architecture of the Massachusetts Institute of Technology
- List of works by Eero Saarinen
