= Sonambient =

Sonambient is the name of a series of 11 vinyl LP albums designed and recorded by mid-century modern sculptor Harry Bertoia.

== History ==
In the later period of his career, Bertoia began to focus on sculpture that interacted with viewers, as well as with the elements such as the wind and weather. He used his Sonambient Sculpture series to produce sounds, by manipulating the metal and other materials. By stretching, bending, striking, and otherwise moving the materials, he made them respond to wind and touch to create different sounds and tones, which he then compiled into a series of musical compositions, released as this series of LPs. He also performed the pieces in a number of concerts.

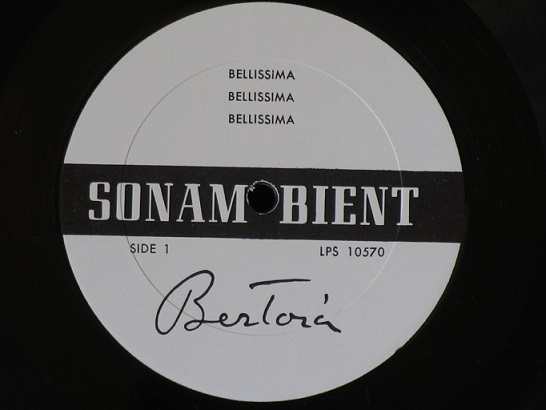
Sonambient by Harry Bertoia (record label showing Bertoias's signature)

The LPs are minimalist in design, similar to the album design work of obscurantist musician Jandek. Each cover had a black and white photograph of one or more of Bertoia's sculptures, often those used in the recording itself, or in some cases one of Bertoia "playing" the sculptures.

The back cover of each LP was very simple and followed the same design, influenced by mid-century modernism: a circle, positioned near the bottom left side, similar in style to a vinyl LP, including the spindle hole in the middle, with "SONAM" on the left and "BIENT" on the right, in a black background band, and "Side 1" above with the title of that side below, and "Side 2" below with the title of that side. In the right-hand bottom corner was a copy of Bertoia's signature, and lower near the corner the catalog number of each release, in the format "F/W 10xx" where xx started at 23 (F/W 1023) and ending the series at 32 (F/W 1032). The 1970 LP "Bellissima, Bellissima, Bellissima / Nova" follows a slightly different cover scheme with a different catalog number (LPS 10570).

In the late 1990s, Bertoia's son Val found a large collection of unopened original album sets in one of the barns on his property in Pennsylvania that he used as a studio. These were sold as collector's items and fetched large sums. Four of the pieces, taken from three of the records, were reissued by a Japanese record label, P.S.F. Records, entitled Unfolding, after one of the tracks on LP catalog #F/W 1024. The CD also contained one track each from F/W #1025 and F/W #1032. P.S.F. Records wanted to release the entire series in CD format, but Val Bertoia has retained the rights, claiming he would release the series himself.

An 11-CD box set of all Harry Bertoia's Sonambient recordings was reported to be released in December 2015 by Important Records.
