= Direct electric action =

Direct electric action is a system used in pipe organs to control the flow of air (wind) into the organ's pipes when the corresponding keys or pedals are depressed. In direct electric action, the valves beneath the pipes are opened directly by electro-magnet solenoids, while with electro-pneumatic action, the electro-magnet's action admits air into a pneumatic or small bellows which in turn operates the pipe's valve.

Other types of actions used in pipe organs are tracker action, using mechanical linkage of rods and levers, and tubular-pneumatic action which utilizes a change of pressure within lead tubing which connects the key to the valve pneumatic.

== Sources ==
- William H. Barnes The Contemporary American Organ (1959)
