= Tubular-pneumatic action =

Type of organ control system

"Tubular-pneumatic action" refers to an apparatus used in many pipe organs built during the late 19th and early 20th centuries. The term "tubular" refers to the extensive use of lead tubing to connect the organ's console to the valves that control the delivery of "wind" (air under pressure) to the pipes. Many such organs are extant 100 or more years after their construction.

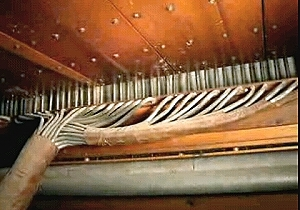
Lead tubing of a 1910 Möller tubular-pneumatic pipe organ.

== Description ==
In any organ, each pipe has a valve located at its foot which responds to the organist's commands from the console's keyboard, pedalboard and stop controls. These valves are contained in windchests upon which the organ's pipework is set. Any type of apparatus that connects an organ's console with its windchest is referred to as its "action". An organ that utilizes tubular-pneumatic action is commonly called a "tubular-pneumatic organ".

It seems the first use of this action was in 1851, in Willis' Great Exhibition organ, though it was only very limited. It appears that the first organ using tubular-pneumatic action throughout was by T. C. Lewis at St Andrew's Hall, Glasgow, in 1877.

== Invention ==
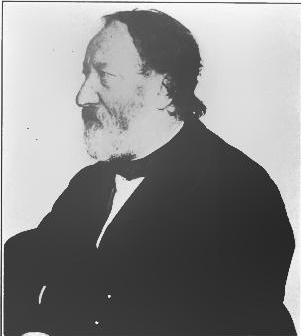
Prosper-Antoine Moitessier

Until the advent of the tubular-pneumatic action, all organs used a system of levers and wooden rods called trackers to transmit the action of the keys and stops to the valves contained within the windchests. This necessitated a close proximity between the console and the chests. In 1845, Prosper-Antoine Moitessier, an organ-builder of Montpellier, France, patented the tubular-pneumatic system, which allowed the console to be at a much greater distance from the organ pipes. Cavaillé-Coll, Henry Willis and Edwin Horsell Pulbrook were pioneers in perfecting and introducing the pneumatic action. The development of the tubular-pneumatic type of organ marked the first departure from the tracker organ style of construction that had been used for hundreds of years.

== Operation ==
The operation of a tubular-pneumatic organ is accomplished by a change of air pressure within lead tubes of about 1/4 in (0.6 cm) inside diameter that connect the organ's console to its windchest. A separate tube is needed for each manual key, pedal key and stop control on the console. A large four manual organ can require over 300 individual tubes.

Two basic types of tubular-pneumatic actions were used: the "pressure" system and the more popular "exhaust" system. Both use three major components for each key and stop: a valve (within the console), a pneumatic motor, commonly called a 'pneumatic' (within the windchest), and a lead tube that connects them.

In the pressure system, the air in the tube and the pneumatic are normally at atmospheric pressure. Depressing a key increases the pressure in the tube, inflating the pneumatic, which opens the pipe's valve.

In the exhaust system, the pneumatic and tube normally contain windchest pressure. Depressing a key lets this pressure exhaust, which collapses the pneumatic and opens the pipe's valve.

== Advantages and disadvantages ==
The advantages of the tubular-pneumatic action over the mechanical tracker action are a lightness of touch that does not change when couplers are used, and the flexibility of console location. Although the former was a great improvement over the tracker organ, the console location was still limited to around 50 ft (20 m) from the pipework.

While some considered the tubular-pneumatic action to be a great achievement in organ building, others thought just the opposite. Sir John Stainer, organist at St Paul's, called it a "triumph of mechanical skill", while the eminent English organist W. T. Best called it "a complete failure; you cannot play a triplet on the Trumpet, and I consider it the most damnnable invention ever placed inside an organ".

The major disadvantage of tubular-pneumatic action is its sluggish response. This becomes more prevalent as the distance between the console and the pipework is increased. In organs whose divisions are located at various distances from the console, this slow response causes an undesirable time lag between the speech of the divisions.

Another disadvantage over a tracker action organ is a lack of "feel" and control of attack by the organist, a trait that is present in all non-tracker action organs.

== Decline of usage ==
With the application of electric power to pipe organ action, the use of tubular-pneumatic action quickly declined. An organ with electro-pneumatic action or direct electric action has the lightness of touch of a tubular-pneumatic organ, but a faster response, and the console can be in any remote location. The console can also be movable, with only a cable connecting it to the rest of the organ.

By the 1920s, tubular-pneumatic organs were rarely built.

Electro-pneumatic chests, however, frequently have sealed wood channels (tubes) in their wooden structural elements and bottom boards, usually consisting of wind channels running between the pipe valve and the primary with its electromagnets. Organ builders harnessed the difference in air pressures inside and outside the organ to do heavier work, taking the weak force of an electromagnet and multiplying its effect pneumatically to pull open pipe valves.

== See also ==
- Electro-pneumatic control
