= Tracker action =

Mechanical linkage between keys and pipes in an organ

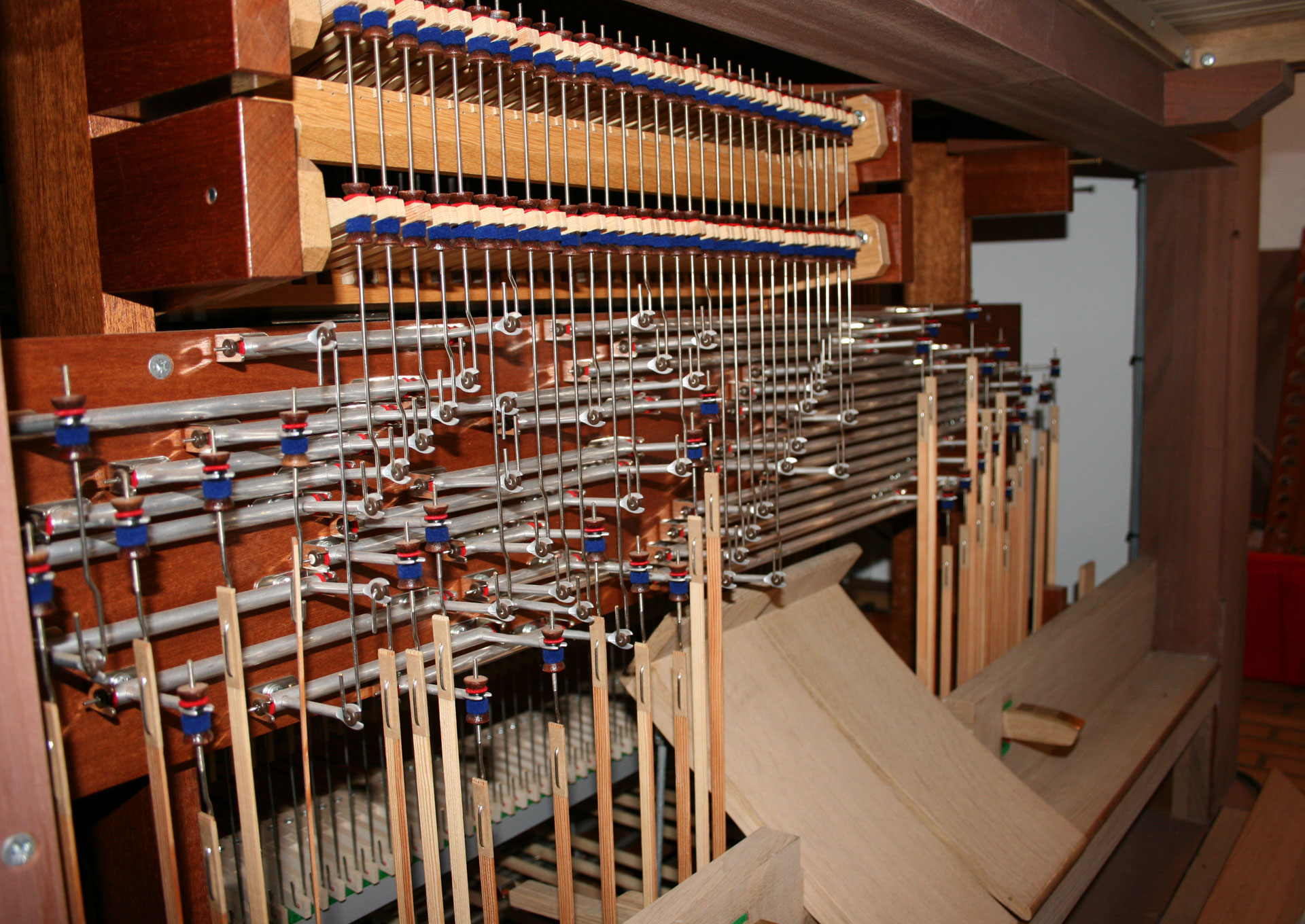
Tracker action in Jørlunde church. Organ by Frobenius (2009)

Tracker action is a term used in reference to pipe organs and steam calliopes to indicate a mechanical linkage between keys or pedals pressed by the organist and the valve that allows air to flow into pipe(s) of the corresponding note. This is in contrast to "direct electric action" and "electro-pneumatic action", which connect the key to the valve through an electrical link or an electrically assisted pneumatic system respectively, or "tubular-pneumatic action" which utilizes a change of pressure within lead tubing which connects the key to the valve pneumatic.

== History ==
=== Ancient history ===
Organs trace their history as far back as at least the 3rd century BC with an organlike device known as the hydraulis. Also known as a "water organ" or "Roman organ", the hydraulis was an instrument in which water was used as a source of power to push wind through organ pipes. (It is not to be confused with the hydraulic action of a hydraulophone, an instrument that actually uses water to produce the sound, not just as a source of power). While the control of air pressure was controlled by water pressure, hence the name, the action was a rudimentary form of modern action.

It was not until the mid-14th century that the action needed to be explored and expanded as finally more pipes were added, as well as the addition of stops, and ultimately multiple cases and keyboards.

=== Baroque and Classical ===
This continued in the 17th and 18th centuries. No particularly great developments took place in the Classical Period.

=== Romantic ===
In the Romantic Period came a new style of organ building. The organ became larger and louder and pneumatically assisted action became the norm in large instruments, to offset the extreme key weight caused by high wind pressures.

=== Contemporary ===
Although tracker action was less utilized in the early 20th century, particularly in England and America, its use has enjoyed a strong renaissance in the same areas since World War II, especially in instruments modeled on historical antecedents. Today, many builders are using tracker action throughout the world, and it has been successfully employed in organs of many styles. Some active builders of tracker action organs include Taylor and Boody of Staunton, Virginia, Paul Fritts of Tacoma, Washington, Flentrop Orgelbouw B.V. of Zaandam, the Netherlands, and C. B. Fisk, Inc. of Gloucester, Massachusetts.

Currently, the world's largest mechanical (tracker) action organ was built by Ronald Sharp in the Concert Hall of the Sydney Opera House, Sydney, Australia, and includes over 10,500 pipes.

Tracker action connects the organ's key and controls to its valves through a mechanical linkage, allowing the movement of a key to operate the corresponding valve directly.

== Components of the action ==
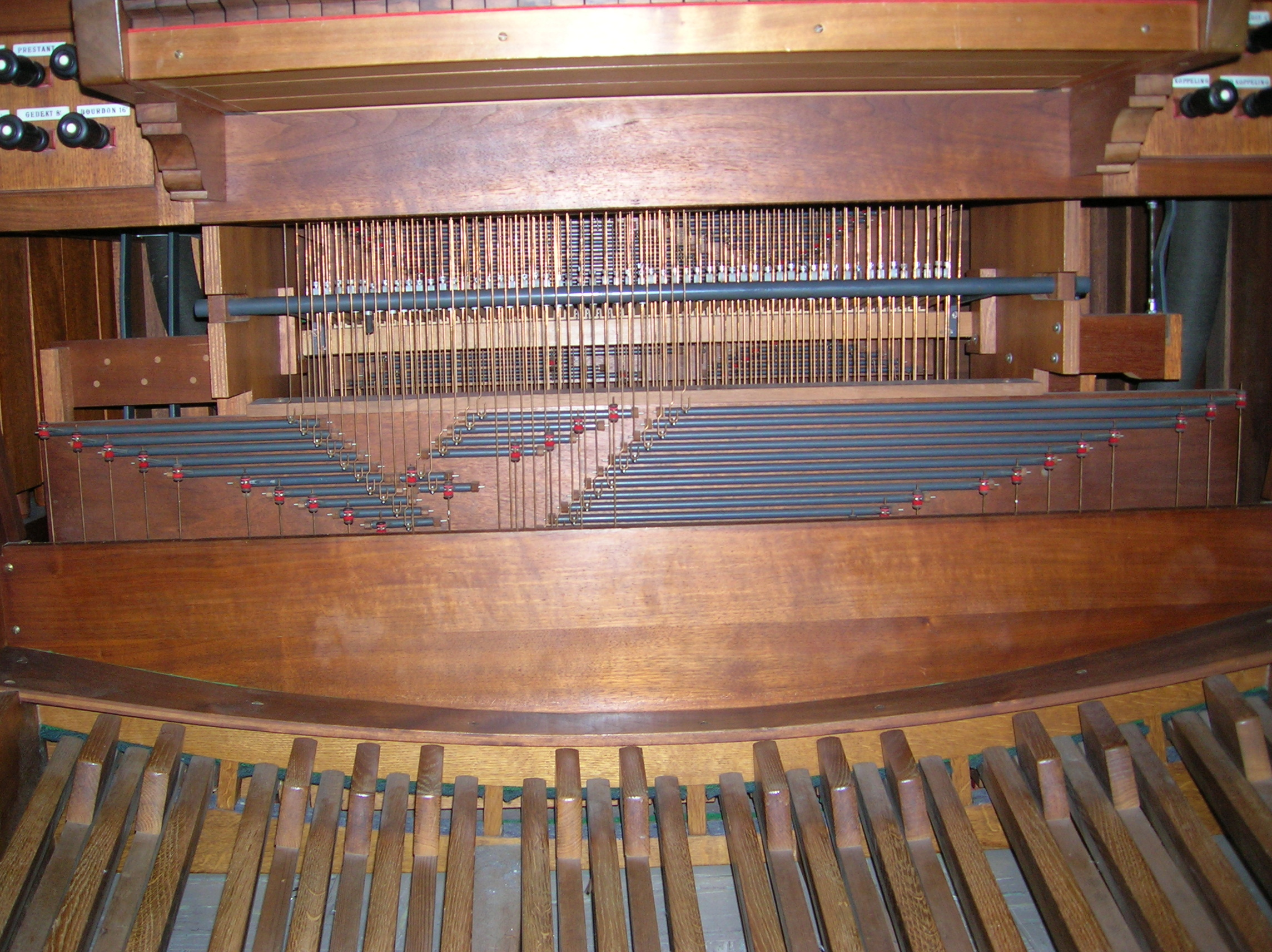
A roller board with rollers and trackers from a 1970 D. A. Flentrop organ

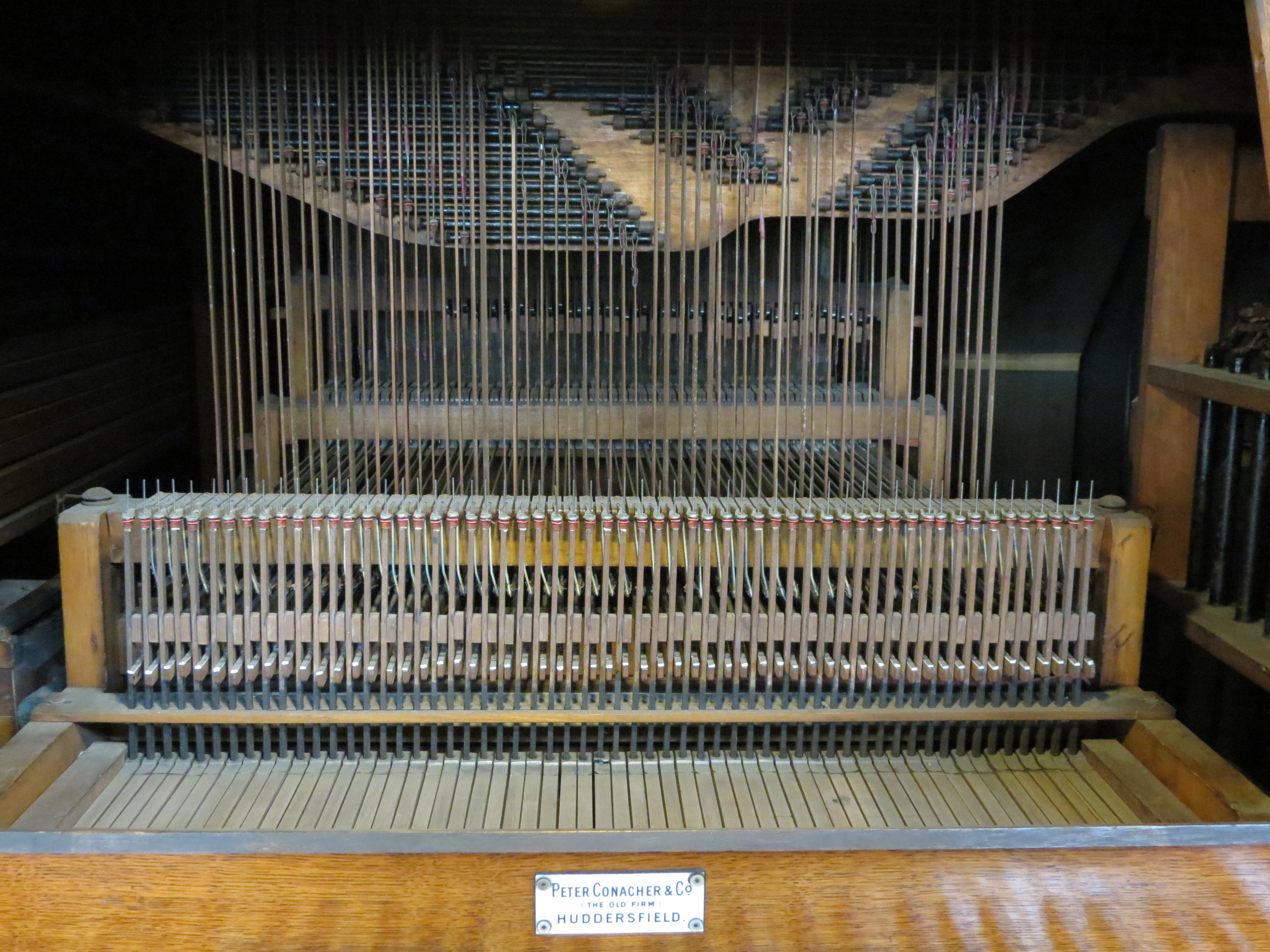
Interior of the organ at Cradley Heath Baptist Church showing the tracker action. The rollers transmit movement sideways to line up with the pipes.

The action consists of many types of devices used for the playing of such said organ, as listed below:

- Trackers – trackers are the portions of the action used to make a pulling motion. Trackers can be used over long distances. They are thin strips of wood, roughly 10 mm wide and 2 mm thick. Although flexible, at rest they hold their shape. Playing a note pulls on the end nearer to the keyboard, so they are in tension while the note is playing. The term comes from the Latin verb "trahere", to draw (in the sense of "pull"); cf. modern English tractor.
- Stickers — used for a pushing motion; often paired with trackers. Their length is limited by the material, though most of the time, capping off at about 250 mm.
- Levers — levers are used to transfer from a tracker (pulling) to a sticker (pushing), or a general change of direction, or both.
- Backfalls — backfalls are used for motion over a small or short distance where trackers and stickers would be otherwise illogical to use. As a natural result, the motion also changes direction.
- Squares — a specific type of lever commonly used in organs which is at a right angle. Squares can also come in a "T" shape and form.
- Rollers — Wooden shafts that rotate. Used for parallel direction in vertical or horizontal motion. They have small levers on each end, like cranks.
- Roller board — location upon which rollers are attached (Note: rollers are often used densely in one section of the action and so are often closely associated with the roller board.)
- Stops — knobs that indirectly control the flow of air over certain ranks of pipes. They are activated with a pulling motion by hand, and deactivated (or stopped) by pushing them shut.
- Trundle — Trundles are used as a substitute for levers in the action associated with the Stops and Slider boards.

The above is a list of mechanisms unique to tracker action. Steam calliopes, such as those built by Thomas J. Nichol in the early twentieth century, used a very simplified tracker mechanism. For actions used in all forms of pipe organs, see pipe organ construction.

== Regulation ==
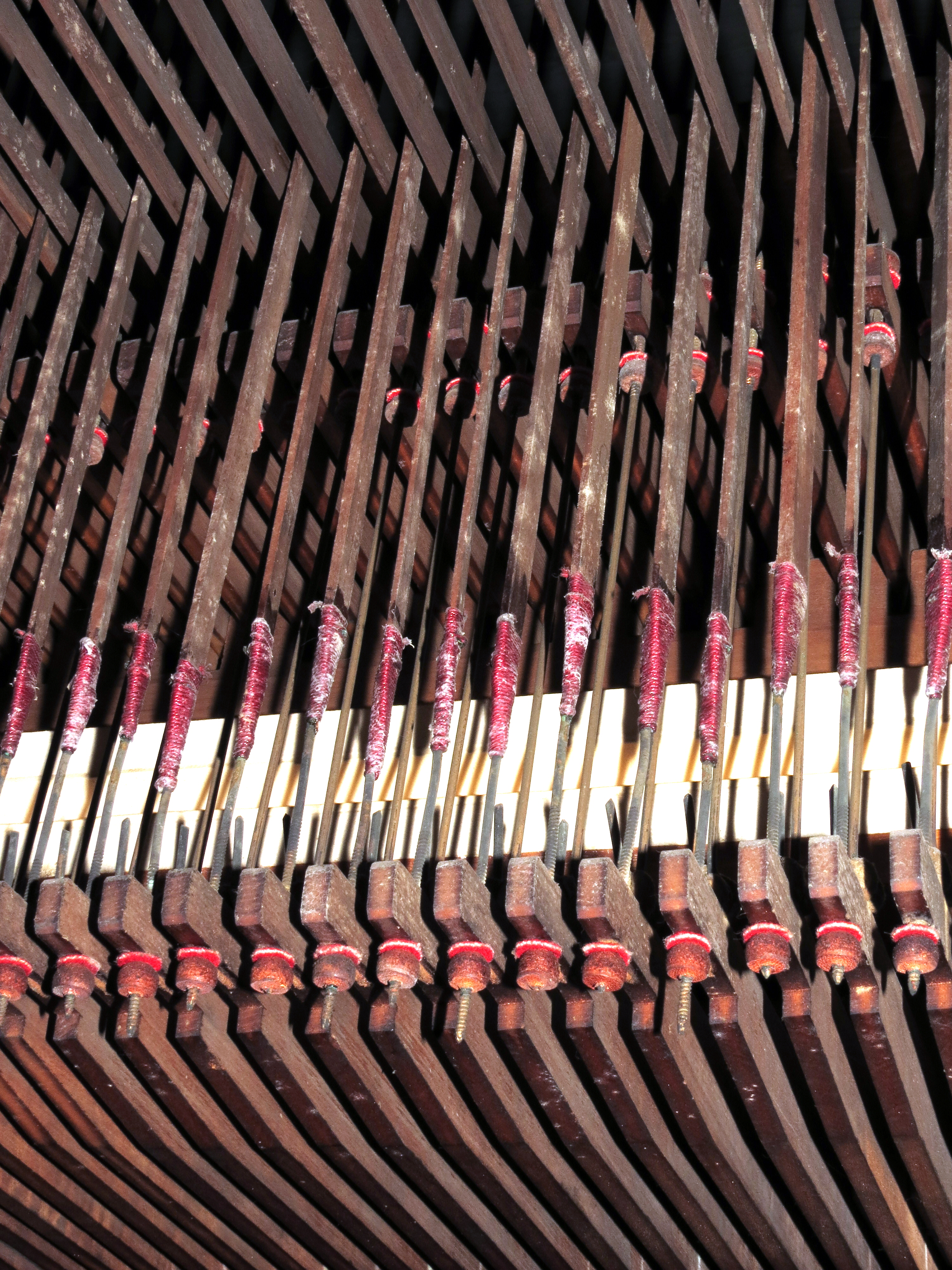
Tracker action at Cradley Heath Baptist Church showing adjusters on tracker ends which engage with the keys of the great organ.

Because of construction tolerances, a means of adjustment, or regulation, of the action has to be provided. This is commonly done by having a threaded wire end on the wooden tracker rods. A circular nut varies the effective length of the tracker where it engages with other parts of the action. One objective of correct regulation is that the keys on each manual have the same rest height and distance of travel when pressed. The regulation wrongly set at one extreme can cause a note to sound when no keys are pressed. This may also be caused by the action sticking after the key is released. The other extreme is that notes do not sound, or sound feebly, when a key is pressed.

== Kinds of action ==
Besides tracker action, two other kinds of action used in pipe organs are as follows:

- Electric action in which electric valves are used to allow wind into the pipes
- Pneumatic action in which compressed air is used to control valves that allow wind into the pipes

== Advantages and disadvantages of tracker action ==
Currently, some organ builders use tracker action in new organs, others use electric action, and still others use either type depending on the instrument. There are builders and organists who have strong feelings regarding the advantages of one type of action over another.

=== Advantages ===
- Tracker action gives the organist more precise control over the exact moment air enters the pipe.
- This control affects the attack and release of a note through different touch. Before the invention of electric action, the organ was a touch-sensitive instrument.
- Tracker action requires less maintenance than other types of action since there are no pneumatics to be re-leathered, no electric contacts to tarnish and no wires to break.

=== Disadvantages ===
- The console or keydesk (where the organist actually plays) cannot be moved.
- On some instruments, as more stops are used, the organist must apply more pressure/force to a key in order for it to play, resulting in heavy playing action when playing full organ. This can be particularly burdensome when two or more manuals are coupled. Problems of heavy action can almost always be overcome through correct use of body weight. The invention of the Barker lever was also meant to counteract this problem, by providing a pneumatic assist while retaining a completely-mechanical action.
- Remote placement of sections of the organ are dependent on the distance the mechanical linkages can successfully extend, as opposed to the unlimited extendability of electric wires in electropneumatic organs.
- The tracker mechanism is often noisy. In quieter passages, the clicking and clattering of the mechanism can be quite distracting.
