= Electro-pneumatic action =

System of pipe organ control

The electro-pneumatic action is a control system by the mean of air pressure for pipe organs, whereby air pressure, controlled by an electric current and operated by the keys of an organ console, opens and closes valves within wind chests, allowing the pipes to speak. This system also allows the console to be physically detached from the organ itself. The only connection was via an electrical cable from the console to the relay, with some early organ consoles utilizing a separate wind supply to operate combination pistons.

== Invention ==
Although early experiments with Barker lever, tubular-pneumatic and electro-pneumatic actions date as far back as the 1850s, credit for a feasible design is generally given to the English organist and inventor, Robert Hope-Jones. He overcame the difficulties inherent in earlier designs by including a rotating centrifugal air blower and replacing banks of batteries with a DC generator, which provided electrical power to the organ. This allowed the construction of new pipe organs without any physical linkages whatsoever. Previous organs used tracker action, which requires a mechanical linkage between the console and the organ windchests, or tubular-pneumatic action, which linked the console and windchests with a large bundle of lead tubing.

== Operation ==
When an organ key is depressed, an electric circuit is completed by means of a switch connected to that key. This causes a low-voltage current to flow through a cable to the windchest, upon which a rank, or multiple ranks of pipes are set. Within the chest, a small electro-magnet associated with the key that is pressed becomes energized. This causes a very small valve to open. This, in turn, allows wind pressure to activate a bellows or "pneumatic" which operates a larger valve. This valve causes a change of air pressure within a channel that leads to all pipes of that note. A separate "stop action" system is used to control the admittance of air or "wind" into the pipes of the rank or ranks selected by the organist's selection of stops, while other ranks are "stopped" from playing. The stop action can also be an electro-pneumatic action, or may be another type of action.

This pneumatically assisted valve action is in contrast to a direct electric action in which each pipe's valve is opened directly by an electric solenoid which is attached to the valve.

== Advantages and disadvantages ==
The console of an organ which uses either type of electric action is connected to the other mechanisms by an electrical cable. This makes it possible for the console to be placed in any desirable location. It also permits the console to be movable, or to be installed on a "lift", as was the practice with theater organs.

While many consider tracker action organs to be more sensitive to the player's control, others find some tracker organs heavy to play and tubular-pneumatic organs to be sluggish, and so prefer electro-pneumatic or direct electric actions.

An electro-pneumatic action requires less current to operate than a direct electric action. This causes less demand on switch contacts. An organ using electro-pneumatic action was more reliable in operation than early direct electric organs until improvements were made in direct electric components.

A disadvantage of an electro-pneumatic organ is its use of large quantities of thin perishable leather, usually lambskin. This requires an extensive "re-leathering" of the windchests every twenty-five to forty years depending upon the quality of the material used, the atmospheric conditions and the use of the organ.

Like tracker and tubular action, electro-pneumatic action—when employing the commonly used pitman-style windchests—is less flexible in operation than direct electric action. When electro-pneumatic action uses unit windchests (as does the electro-pneumatic action constructed by organ builder Schoenstein & Co.), then it works similarly to direct electric action, in which each rank operates independently, allowing "unification", where each individual rank on a windchest can be played at various octave ranges.

A drawback to older electric action organs was the large amount of wiring required for operation. With each stop tab and key being wired, the transmission cable could easily contain several hundred wires. The great number of wires required between the keyboards, the banks of relays and the organ itself, with each solenoid requiring its own signal wire, made the situation worse, especially if a wire was broken (this was particularly true with consoles located on lifts and/or turntables), which made tracing the break very difficult.

These problems increased with the size of the instrument, and it would not be unusual for a particular organ to contain over a hundred miles of wiring. The largest pipe organ in the world, the Boardwalk Hall Auditorium Organ, is said to contain more than 137,500 miles (221,300 km) of wire. Modern electronic switching has largely overcome these physical problems.

== Modern methods ==
In the years after the advent of the transistor, and later, integrated circuits and microprocessors, miles of wiring and electro-pneumatic relays have given way to electronic and computerized control and relay systems, which have made the control of pipe organs much more efficient. But for its time, the electro-pneumatic action was considered a great success, and even today modernized versions of this action are used in many new pipe organs, especially in the United States and the United Kingdom.
