= Pipe organ =

Wind instrument controlled by keyboard

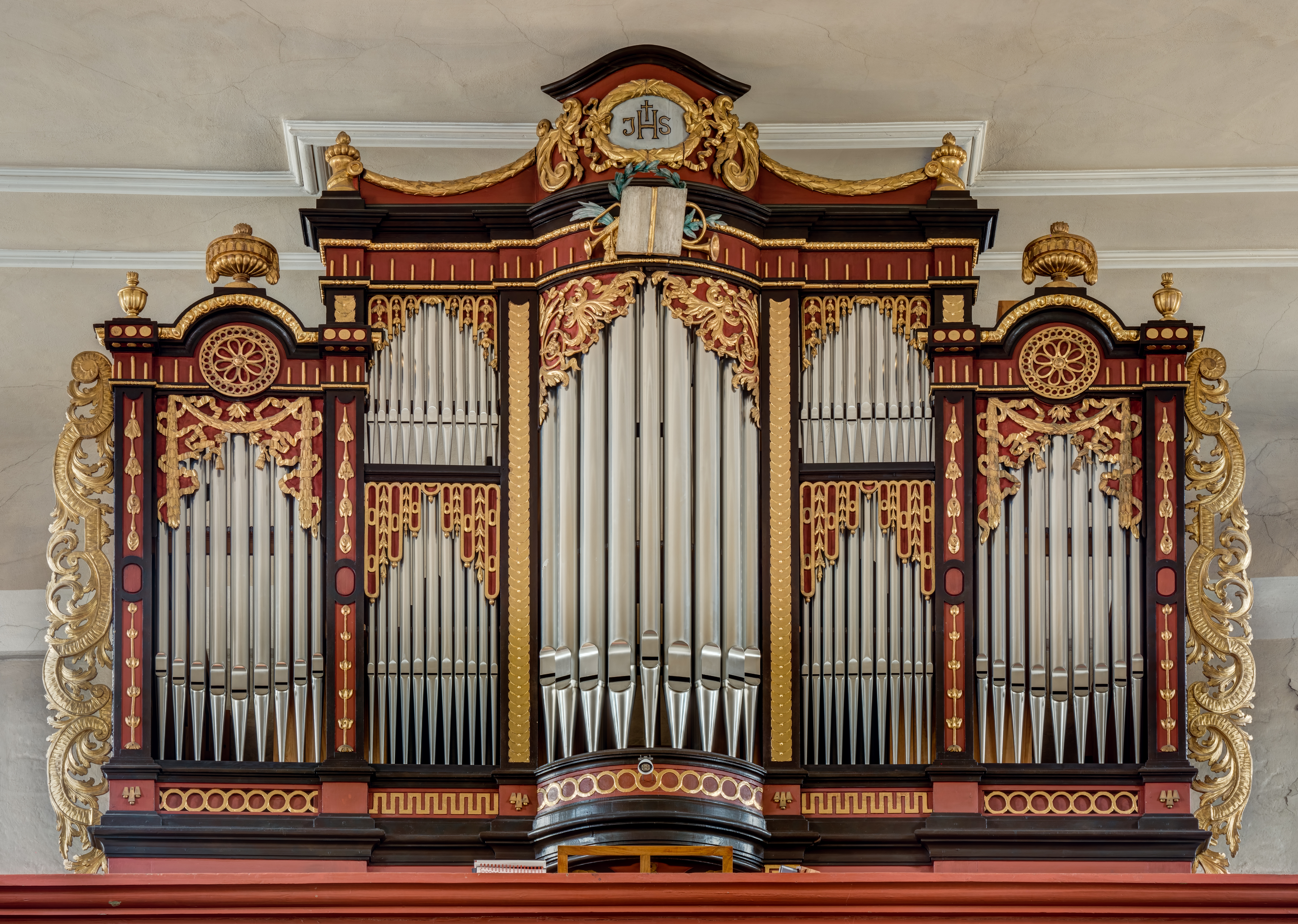
- Pipe organ in the collegiate church of St. Michael in Neunkirchen am Brand

Keyboard instrument
- Other names: Organ, Church organ (used only for organs in houses of worship)
- Classification: Aerophone
- Hornbostel–Sachs classification: 422.222.11 (flue pipes); 422.122 (beating reed pipes); 422.132 (free reed pipes)
- Inventor: Ctesibius
- Developed: 3rd century BC

Playing range

Related instruments
- see Organ

Builders
- see List of pipe organ builders and Category:Pipe organ builders

Sound sample
- Improvisation in E, played on the organ located in the St. George's Minster in the town of Dinkelsbühl.

The pipe organ is a musical instrument that produces sound by driving pressurised air (called wind) through the organ pipes selected from a keyboard. Because each pipe produces a single tone and pitch, the pipes are provided in sets called ranks, each of which has a common timbre, loudness (volume), and construction throughout the keyboard compass. In other words, a rank is a set of pipes all having the same tonal quality, but having a range of different pitches. Most organs have many ranks of pipes of differing pitch, timbre, and volume that the player can employ singly or in combination through the use of controls called stops.

A pipe organ has one or more keyboards (called manuals) played by the hands, and most have a pedalboard played by the feet; each keyboard controls its own division (group of stops). The keyboard(s), pedalboard, and stops are housed in the organ's console. The organ's continuous supply of wind allows it to sustain notes for as long as the corresponding keys are pressed, unlike the piano and harpsichord whose sound begins to dissipate immediately after a key is depressed. The smallest portable pipe organs may have only one or two dozen pipes and one manual; the largest pipe organs can have over 33,000 pipes and seven manuals. A list of some of the most notable and largest pipe organs in the world can be viewed at List of pipe organs. A ranking of the largest organs in the world—based on the criterion constructed by Michał Szostak, i.e. 'the number of ranks and additional equipment managed from a single console'—can be found in the quarterly magazine The Organ and in the online journal Vox Humana.

The origins of the pipe organ can be traced back to the hydraulis in Ancient Greece, in the 3rd century BC, in which the wind supply was created by the weight of displaced water in an airtight container. By the 6th or 7th century AD, bellows were used to supply Byzantine organs with wind. A pipe organ with "great leaden pipes" was sent to the West by the Byzantine emperor Constantine V as a gift to Pepin the Short, King of the Franks, in 757. Pepin's son Charlemagne requested a similar organ for his chapel in Aachen in 812, beginning the pipe organ's establishment in Western European church music. In England, "The first organ of which any detailed record exists was built in Winchester Cathedral in the 10th century. It was a huge machine with 400 pipes, which needed two men to play it and 70 men to blow it, and its sound could be heard throughout the city." Beginning in the 12th century, the organ began to evolve into a complex instrument capable of producing different timbres. By the 17th century, most of the sounds available on the modern classical organ had been developed. At that time, the pipe organ was the most complex human-made device—a distinction it retained until it was displaced by the telephone exchange in the late 19th century.

Pipe organs are installed in churches, synagogues, concert halls, schools, mansions, other public buildings and in private properties. They are used in the performance of classical music, sacred music, secular music, and popular music. In the early 20th century, pipe organs were installed in theaters to accompany the screening of films during the silent movie era; in municipal auditoria, where orchestral transcriptions were popular; and in the homes of the wealthy. The beginning of the 21st century has seen a resurgence in installations in concert halls. A substantial organ repertoire spans over 500 years.

== History and development ==
=== Antiquity ===
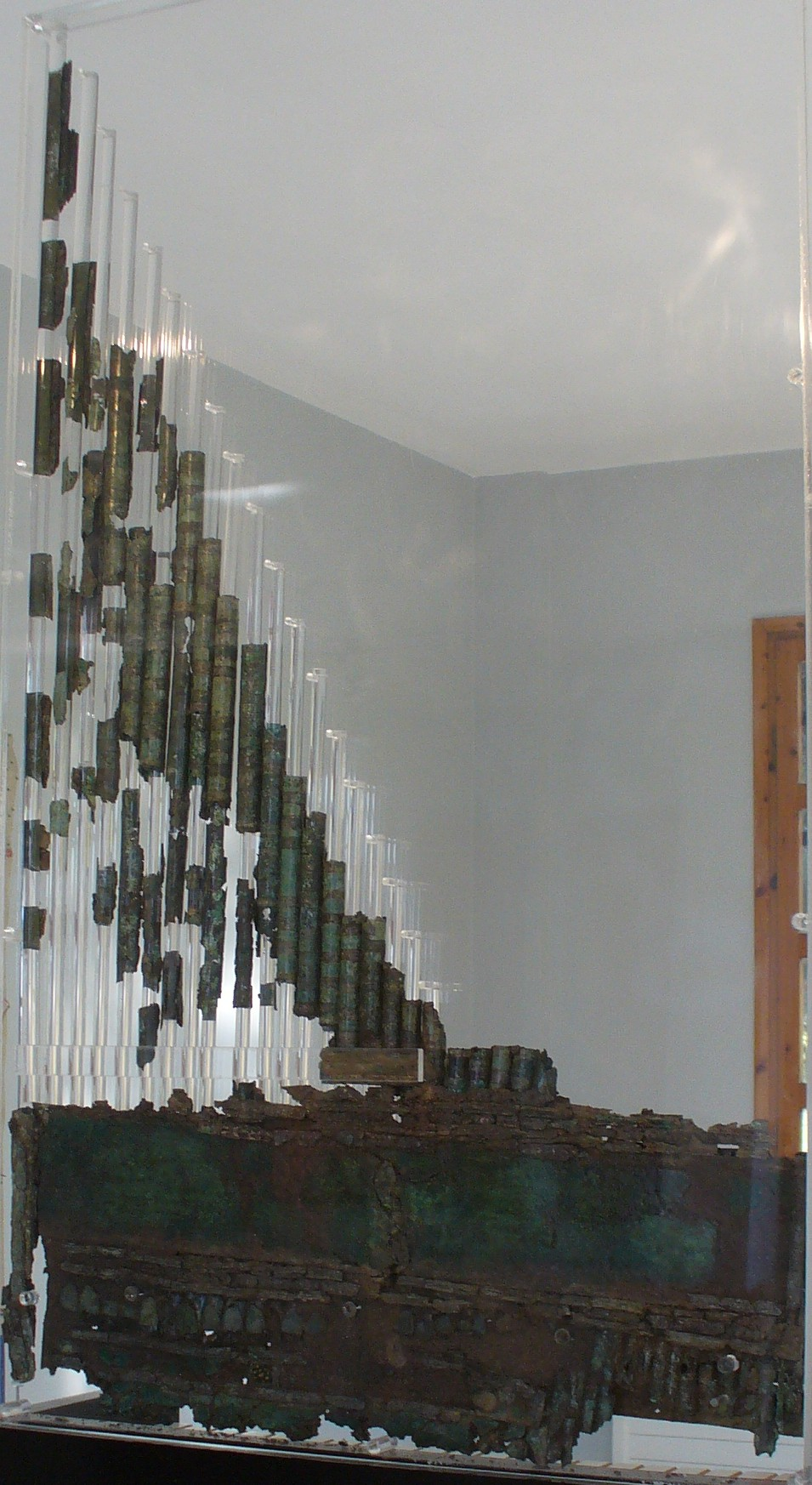
Hydraulis from the 1st century BC, oldest organ found to date, Museum of Dion, Greece

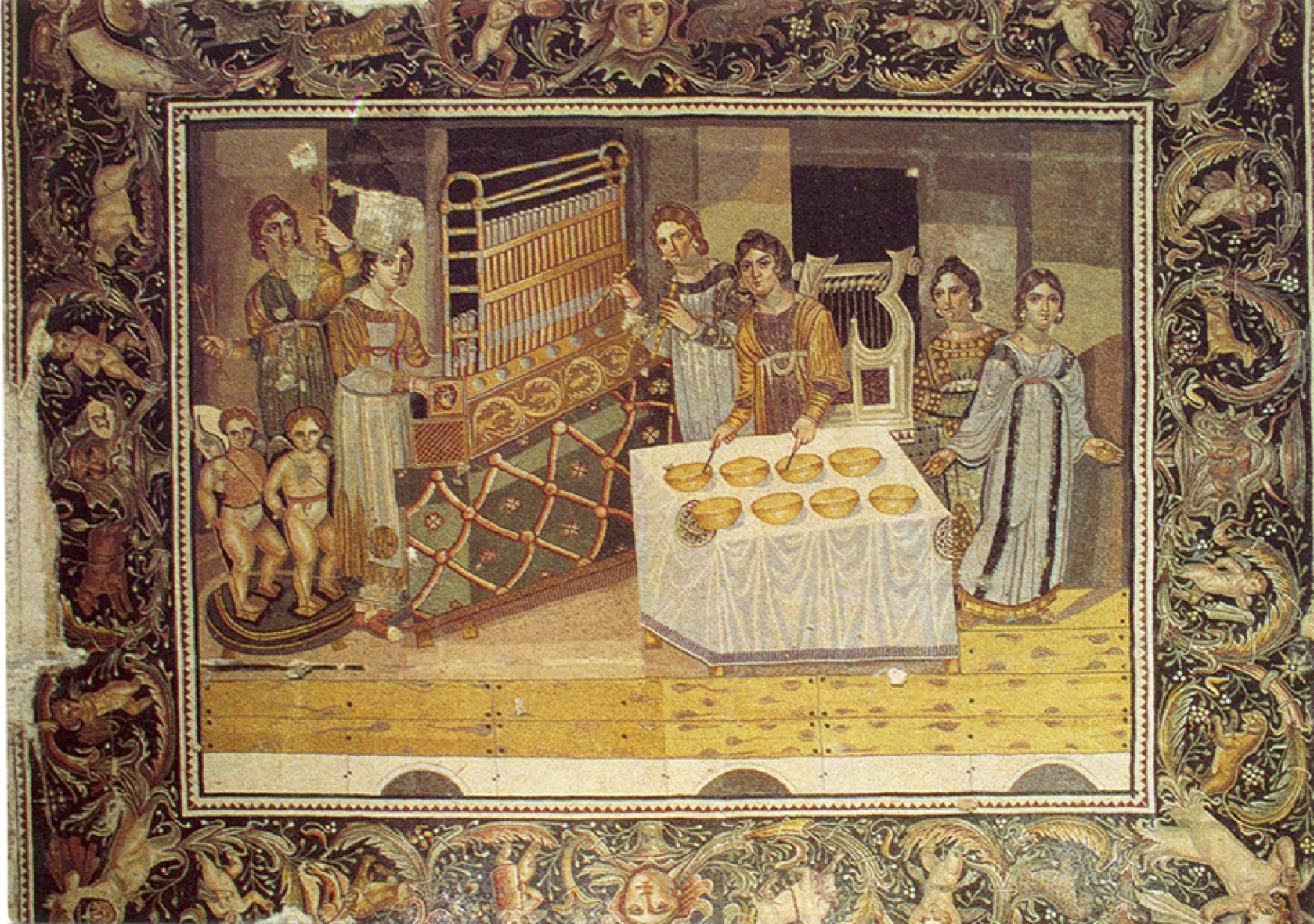
4th-century AD "Mosaic of the Female Musicians" from a Byzantine villa in Maryamin, Syria.

The organ is one of the oldest instruments still used in European classical music that has commonly been credited as having been derived from Greece. Its earliest predecessors were built in ancient Greece in the 3rd century BC. The word organ is derived from the Ancient Greek ὄργανον (órganon), a generic term for an instrument or a tool, via the Latin organum, an instrument similar to a portative organ used in ancient Roman circus games.

The Greek engineer Ctesibius of Alexandria is credited with inventing the organ in the 3rd century BC. He devised an instrument called the hydraulis, which delivered a wind supply maintained through water pressure to a set of pipes. The hydraulis was played in the arenas of the Roman Empire. The pumps and water regulators of the hydraulis were replaced by an inflated leather bag in the 2nd century AD, and true bellows began to appear in the Eastern Roman Empire in the 6th or 7th century AD. Some 400 pieces of a hydraulis from the year 228 AD were revealed during the 1931 archaeological excavations in the former Roman town Aquincum, province of Pannonia (modern Budapest), which was used as a music instrument by the Aquincum fire dormitory; a modern replica produces an enjoyable sound.

The 9th-century Persian geographer Ibn Khurradadhbih (d. 913), in his lexicographical discussion of instruments, cited the urghun (organ) as one of the typical instruments of the Eastern Roman (Byzantine) Empire. It was often used in the Hippodrome in the imperial capital of Constantinople. A Syrian visitor describes a pipe organ powered by two servants pumping "bellows like a blacksmith's" played while guests ate at the emperor's Christmas dinner in Constantinople in 911. The first Western European pipe organ with "great leaden pipes" was sent from Constantinople to the West by the Byzantine emperor Constantine V as a gift to Pepin the Short King of the Franks in 757. Pepin's son Charlemagne requested a similar organ for his chapel in Aachen in 812, beginning its establishment in Western European church music.

=== Medieval ===
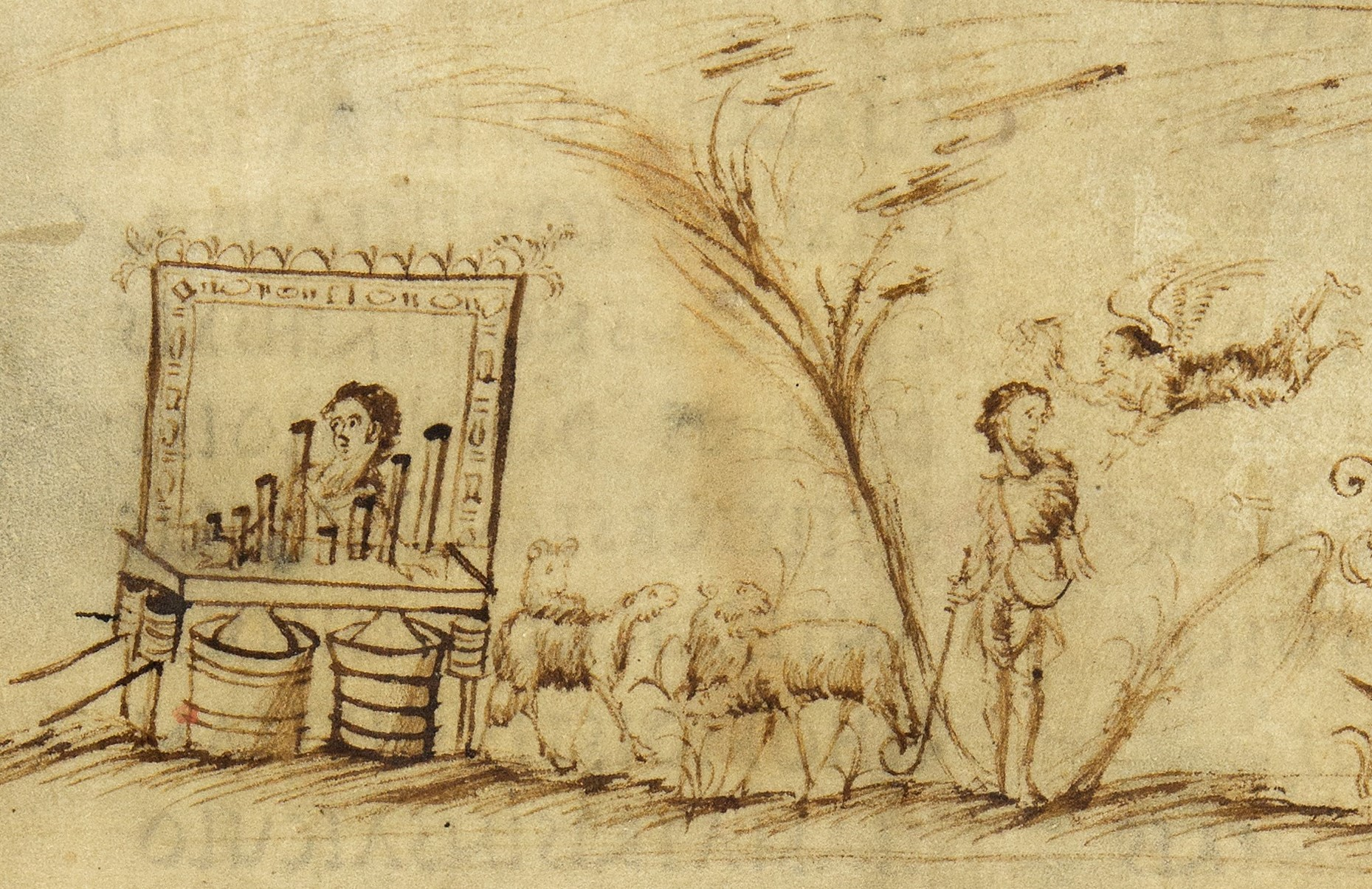
9th-century image of an organ, from the Utrecht Psalter.

From 800 to the 1400s, the use and construction of organs developed in significant ways, from the invention of the portative and positive organs to the installation of larger organs in major churches such as the cathedrals of Winchester and Notre Dame of Paris. In this period, organs began to be used in secular and religious settings. The introduction of organ into religious settings is ambiguous, most likely because the original position of the Church was that instrumental music was not to be allowed. By the 12th century there is evidence for permanently installed organs existing in religious settings such as the Abbey of Fécamp and other locations throughout Europe.

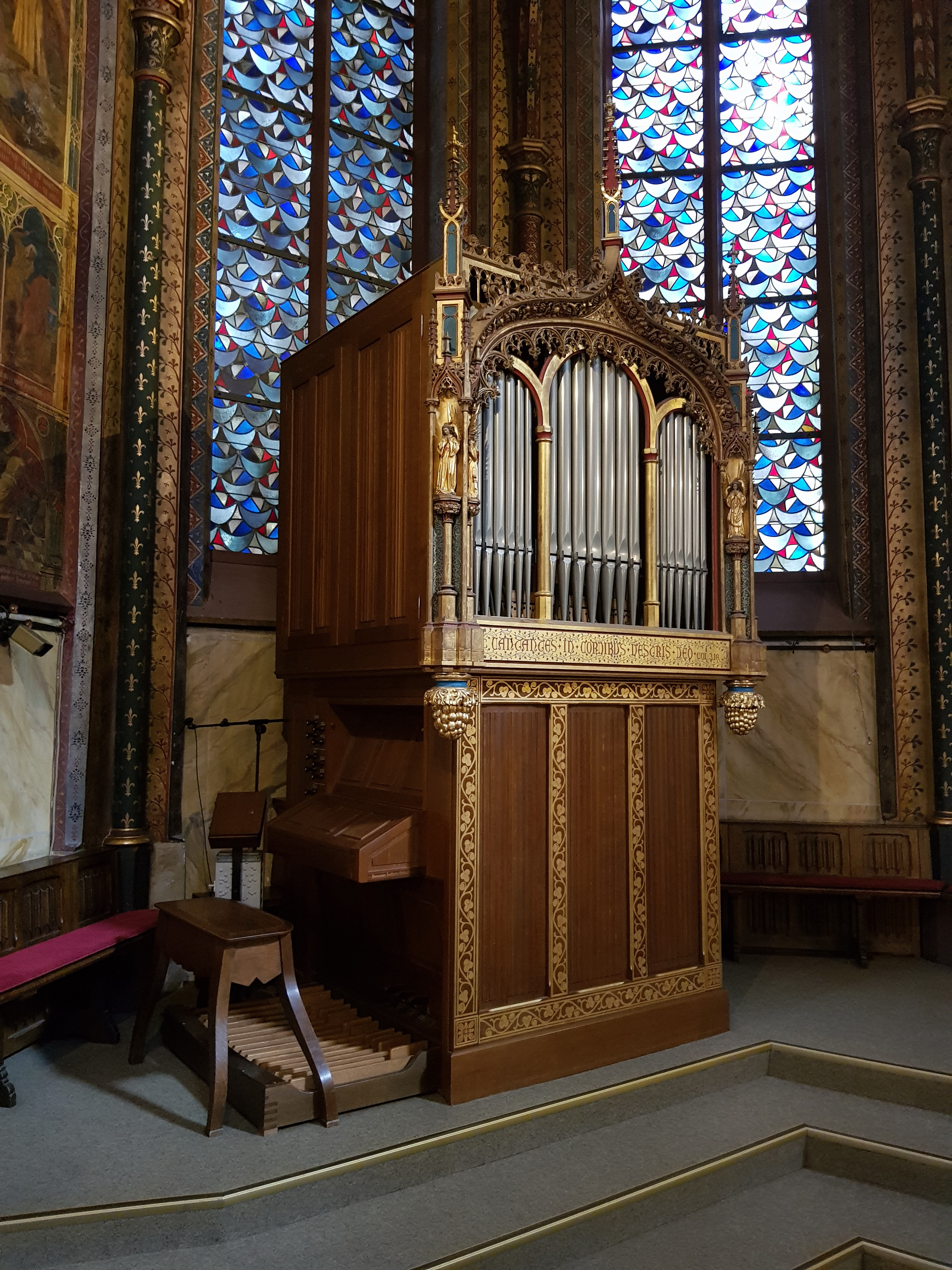
A smaller positive organ, which is designed to be small and portable.

Several innovations occurred to organs in the Middle Ages, such as the creation of the portative and the positive organ. The portative organs were small and created for secular use and made of lightweight, delicate materials that would have been easy for one individual to transport and play on their own. The portative organ was a "flue-piped keyboard instrument, played with one hand while the other operated the bellows." Its portability made the portative useful for the accompaniment of both sacred and secular music in a variety of settings. The positive organ was larger than the portative organ but was still small enough to be portable and used in a variety of settings like the portative organ. Toward the middle of the 13th century, the portatives represented in the miniatures of illuminated manuscripts appear to have real keyboards with balanced keys, as in the Cantigas de Santa Maria.

It is difficult to directly determine when larger organs were first installed in Europe. An early detailed eyewitness account from Wulfstan of Winchester gives an idea of what organs were like prior to the 13th century, after which more records of large church organs exist. In his account, he describes the sound of the organ: "among them bells outstanding in tone and size, and an organ [sounding] through bronze pipes prepared according to the musical proportions." This is one of the earliest accounts of organs in Europe and also indicates that the organ was large and more permanent than other evidence would suggest.

The first organ documented to have been permanently installed was one installed in 1361 in Halberstadt, Germany. The first documented permanent organ installation likely prompted Guillaume de Machaut to describe the organ as "the king of instruments", a characterization still frequently applied. The Halberstadt organ was the first instrument to use a chromatic key layout across its three manuals and pedalboard, although the keys were wider than on modern instruments. The width of the keys was slightly over 6.4 centimetres (2.5 in), wide enough to be struck down by the fist, as the early keys are reported to have invariably been manipulated. It had twenty bellows operated by ten men, and the wind pressure was so high that the player had to use the full strength of their arm to hold down a key.

Records of other organs permanently installed and used in worship services in the late 13th and 14th centuries are found in large cathedrals such as Notre Dame, the latter documenting organists hired to by the church and the installation of larger and permanent organs. The earliest is a payment in 1332 from the clergy of Notre Dame to an organist to perform on the feasts St. Louis and St. Michael. The Notre Dame School also shows how organs could have been used within the increased use of polyphony, which would have allowed for the use of more instrumental voices within the music. According to documentation from the 9th century by Walafrid Strabo, the organ was also used for music during other parts of the church service—the prelude and postlude the main examples—and not just for the effect of polyphony with the choir. Other possible instances of this were short interludes played on the organ either in between parts of the church service or during choral songs, but they were not played at the same time as the choir was singing. This shows that by this point in time organs were fully used within church services and not just in secular settings. Organs from earlier in the medieval period are evidenced by surviving keyboards and casings, but no pipes. Until the mid-15th century, organs had no stop controls. Each manual controlled ranks at many pitches, known as the "Blockwerk." Around 1450, controls were designed that allowed the ranks of the Blockwerk to be played individually. These devices were the forerunners of modern stop actions. The higher-pitched ranks of the Blockwerk remained grouped together under a single stop control; these stops developed into mixtures.

=== Renaissance and Baroque periods ===
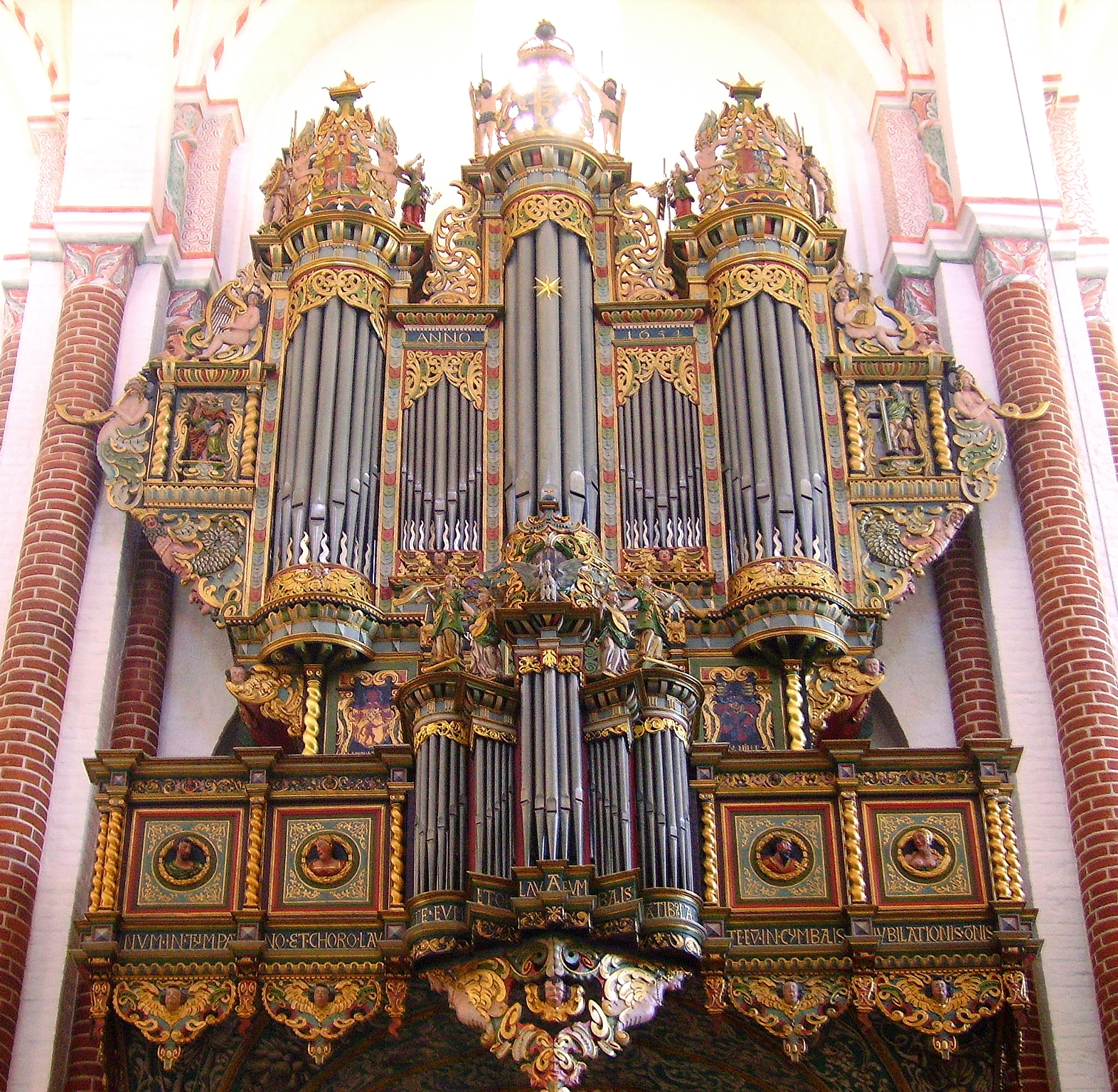
The baroque organ in Roskilde Cathedral, Denmark

During the Renaissance and Baroque periods, the organ's tonal colors became more varied. Organ builders fashioned stops that imitated various instruments, such as the krummhorn and the viola da gamba. Builders such as Arp Schnitger, Jasper Johannsen, Zacharias Hildebrandt and Gottfried Silbermann constructed instruments that were in themselves artistic, displaying both exquisite craftsmanship and beautiful sound. These organs featured well-balanced mechanical key actions, giving the organist precise control over the pipe speech. Schnitger's organs featured particularly distinctive reed timbres and large Pedal and Rückpositiv divisions.

Different national styles of organ building began to develop, often due to changing political climates. In the Netherlands, the organ became a large instrument with several divisions, doubled ranks, and mounted cornets. The organs of northern Germany also had more divisions, and independent pedal divisions became increasingly common. Organ makers began designing their cases in such a way that the divisions of the organ were visibly discernible. Twentieth-century musicologists have retroactively labelled this the Werkprinzip.

Baroque pipe organ of the 18th century at Monastery of Santa Cruz, Coimbra, Portugal; note the pipes laid out horizontally (rather than vertically) in two ranks below the tallest pipes and stretching from the far left of the image to the far right

In France, as in Italy, Spain and Portugal, organs were primarily designed to play alternatim verses rather than accompany congregational singing. The French Classical Organ became remarkably consistent throughout France over the course of the Baroque era, more so than any other style of organ building in history, and standardized registrations developed. This type of instrument was elaborately described by Dom Bédos de Celles in his treatise L'art du facteur d'orgues (The Art of Organ Building). The Italian Baroque organ was often a single-manual instrument, without pedals. It was built on a full diapason chorus of octaves and fifths. The stop-names indicated the pitch relative to the fundamental ("Principale") and typically reached extremely short nominal pipe-lengths (for example, if the Principale were 8′, the "Vigesimanona" was 1/2′). The highest ranks "broke back", their smallest pipes replaced by pipes pitched an octave lower to produce a kind of composite treble mixture.

In England, many pipe organs were destroyed or removed from churches during the English Reformation of the 16th century and the Commonwealth period. Some were relocated to private homes. At the Restoration, organ builders such as Renatus Harris and "Father" Bernard Smith brought new organ-building ideas from continental Europe. English organs evolved from small one- or two-manual instruments into three or more divisions disposed in the French manner with grander reeds and mixtures, though still without pedal keyboards. The Echo division began to be enclosed in the early 18th century, and in 1712, Abraham Jordan claimed his "swelling organ" at St Magnus-the-Martyr to be a new invention. The swell box and the independent pedal division appeared in English organs beginning in the 18th century.

=== Romantic period ===
During the Romantic period, the organ became more symphonic, capable of creating a gradual crescendo. This was made possible by voicing stops in such a way that families of tone that historically had only been used separately could now be used together, creating an entirely new way of approaching organ registration. New technologies and the work of organ builders such as Eberhard Friedrich Walcker, Aristide Cavaillé-Coll, and Henry Willis made it possible to build larger organs with more stops, more variation in sound and timbre, and more divisions. For instance, as early as in 1808, the first 32′ Contre-Bombarde was installed in the great organ of Nancy Cathedral, France. This stop, still used today, provides a powerful bass and an electrifying sound to the full organ sound. Enclosed divisions became common, and registration aids were developed to make it easier for the organist to manage the great number of stops. The desire for louder, grander organs required that the stops be voiced on a higher wind pressure than before. As a result, a greater force was required to overcome the wind pressure and depress the keys. To solve this problem, Cavaillé-Coll configured the English "Barker lever" to assist in operating the key action. This is, essentially, a servomechanism that uses wind pressure from the air plenum, to augment the force that is exerted by the player's fingers.

Organ builders began to prefer specifications with fewer mixtures and high-pitched stops, more 8′ and 16′ stops and wider pipe scales. These practices created a warmer, richer sound than was common in the 18th century. Organs began to be built in concert halls (such as the organ at the Palais du Trocadéro in Paris), and composers such as Camille Saint-Saëns and Gustav Mahler used the organ in their orchestral works.

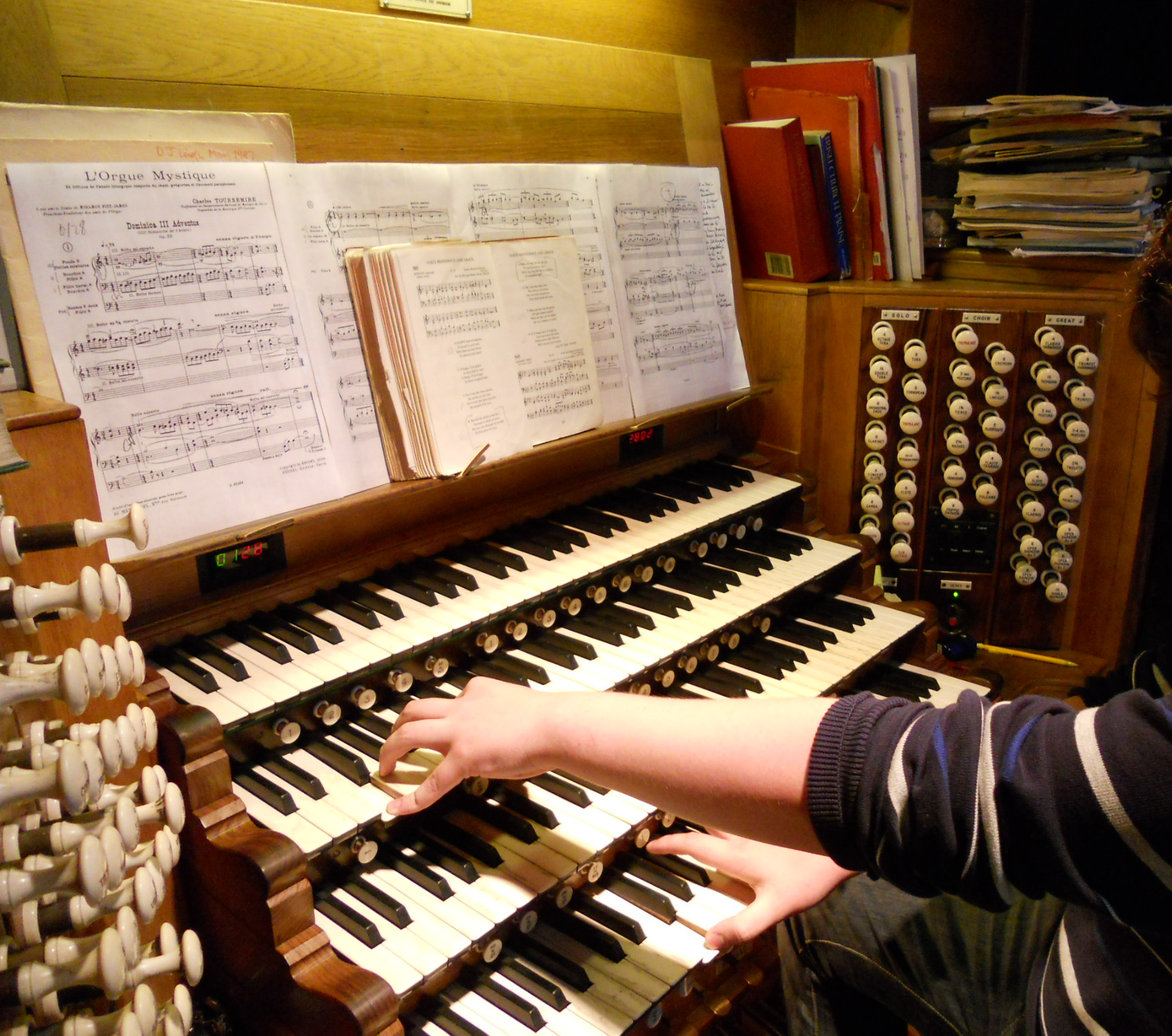
A typical modern 20th-century console, located in St Patrick's Cathedral, Dublin

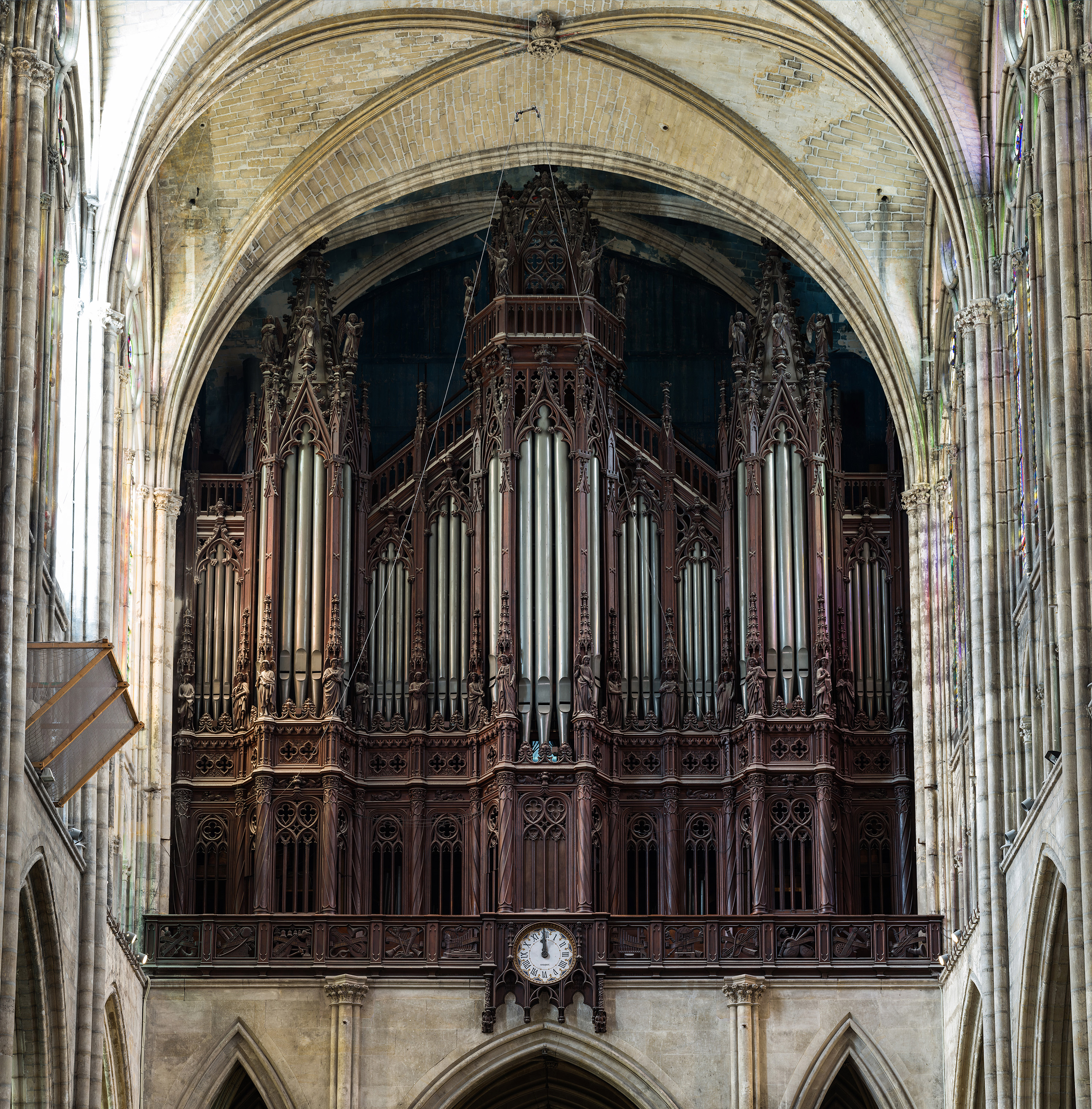
The organ of the Cathedral-Basilica of Saint-Denis (France), first organ of Aristide Cavaille-Coll containing numerous innovations, and especially the first Barker lever.

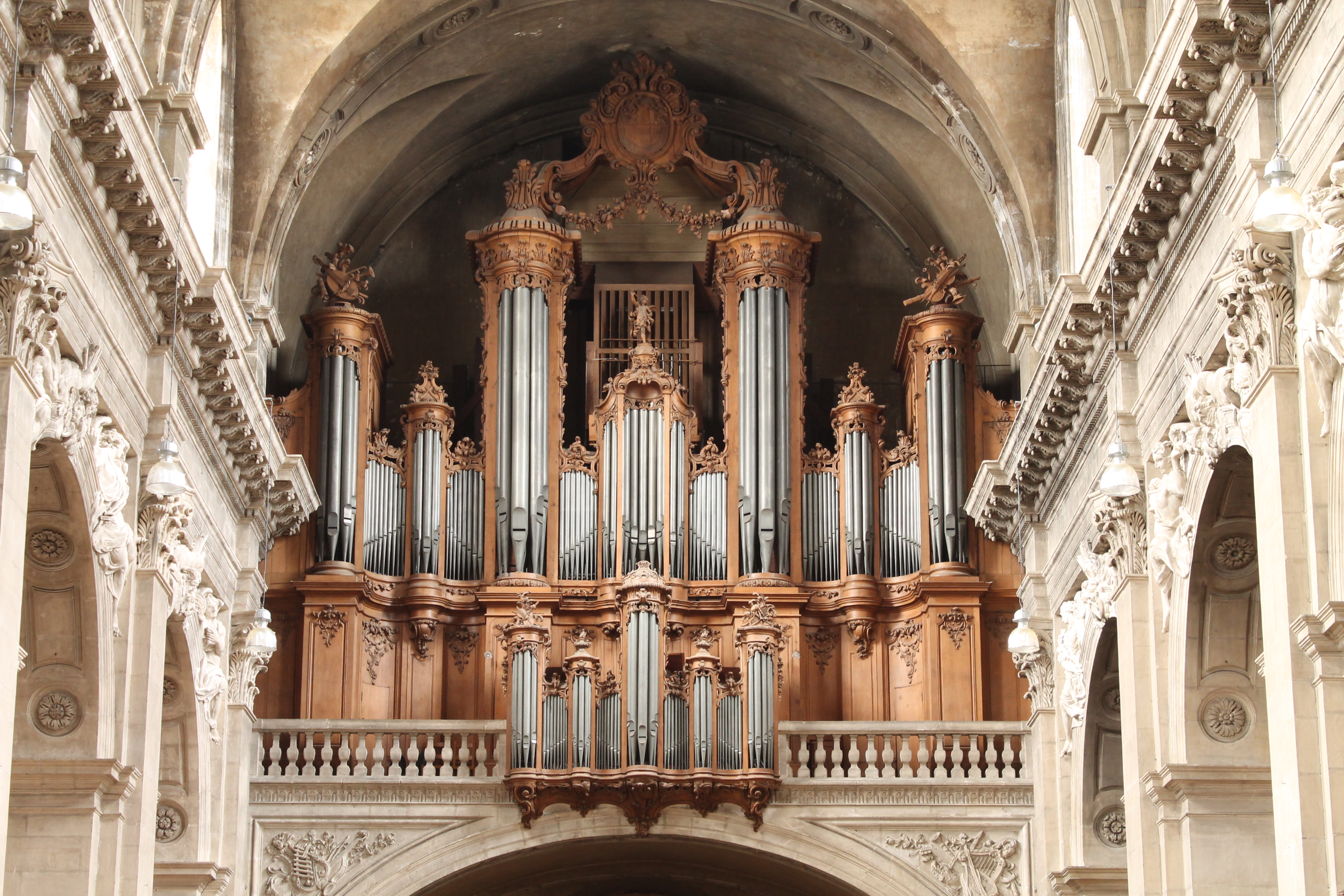
The Cavaillé-Coll organ of the cathedral of Nancy, featured the first 32′ Bombarde in France. (France)

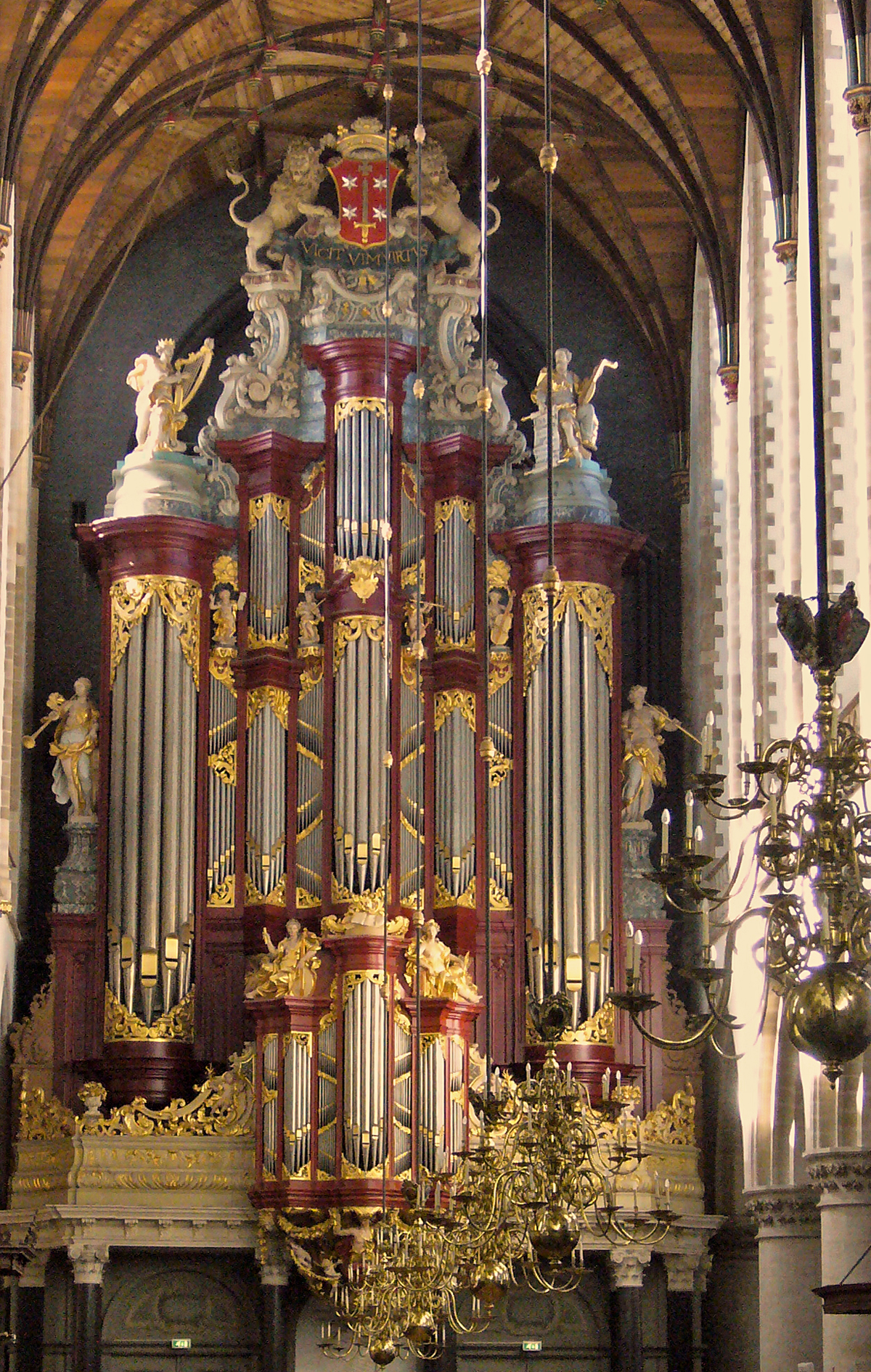
Façade of the pipe organ at the Grote Kerk, Haarlem in the Netherlands, Mozart once played this organ.

=== Modern developments ===
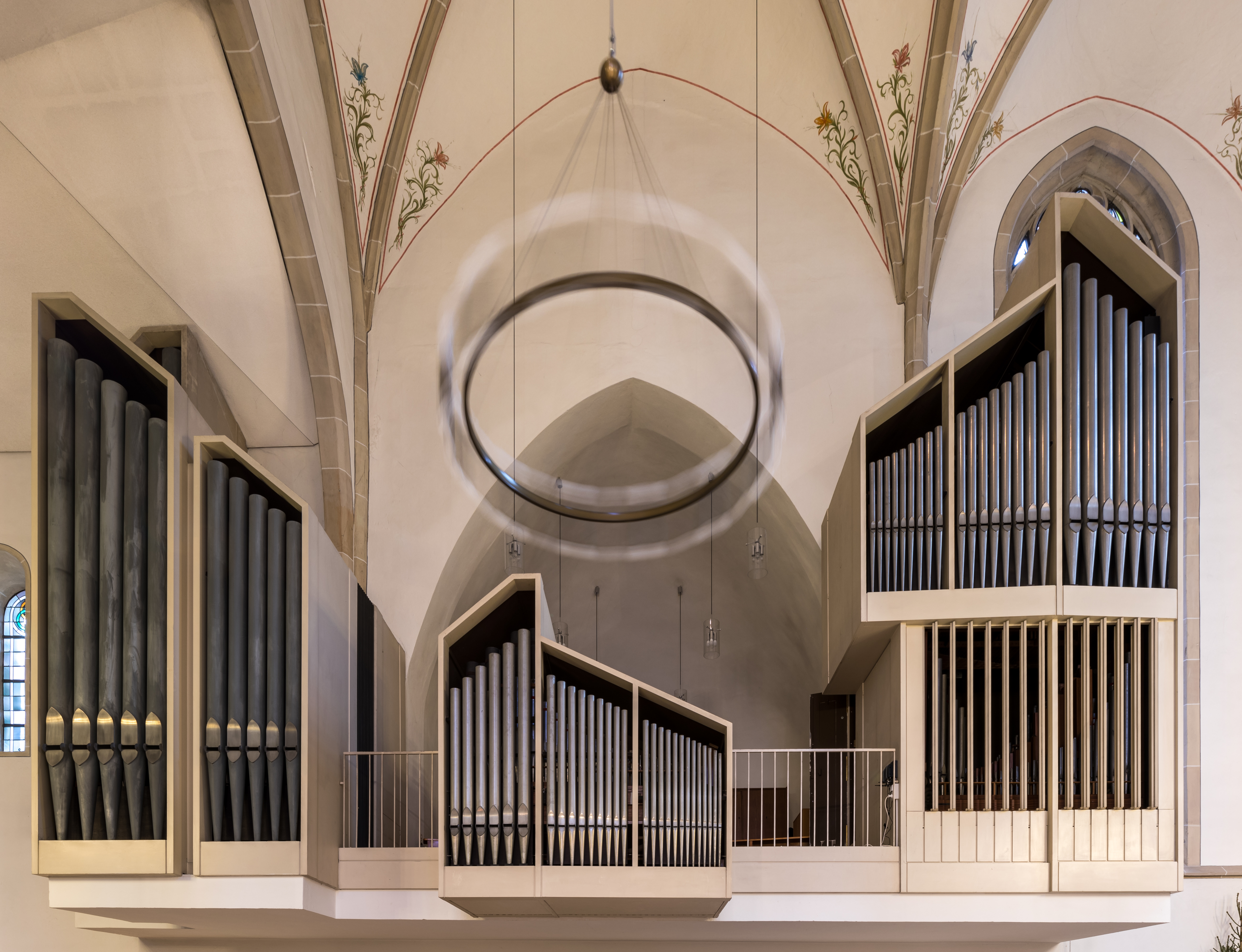
The pipe organ in the St Viktor Church, Dülmen, North Rhine-Westphalia, Germany, exhibits a modern façade.

The development of pneumatic and electro-pneumatic key actions in the late 19th century made it possible to locate the console independently of the pipes, greatly expanding the possibilities in organ design. Electric stop actions were also developed, which allowed sophisticated combination actions to be created.

Beginning in the early 20th century in Germany and in the mid-20th century in the United States, organ builders began to build historically inspired instruments modeled on Baroque organs. They returned to building mechanical key actions, voicing with lower wind pressures and thinner pipe scales, and designing specifications with more mixture stops. This became known as the Organ Reform Movement.

The Catholic Church, in its 1963 Second Vatican Council decree on the Sacred Liturgy, whilst allowing the use of other musical instruments, declared that "in the Latin Church, the pipe organ is to be held in high esteem, for it is the traditional musical instrument which adds a wonderful splendor to the Church's ceremonies and powerfully lifts up man's mind to God and to higher things".

In the late 20th century, organ builders began to incorporate digital components into their key, stop, and combination actions. Besides making these mechanisms simpler and more reliable, this also makes it possible to record and play back an organist's performance using the MIDI protocol. In addition, some organ builders have incorporated digital (electronic) stops into their pipe organs.

The electronic organ developed throughout the 20th century. Some pipe organs were replaced by digital organs because of their lower purchase price, smaller physical size, and minimal maintenance requirements. In the early 1970s, Rodgers Instruments pioneered the hybrid organ, an electronic instrument that incorporates real pipes; other builders such as Allen Organs and Johannus Orgelbouw have since built hybrid organs. Allen Organs first introduced the electronic organ in 1937 and in 1971 created the first digital organ using CMOS technology borrowed from NASA which created the digital pipe organ using sound recorded from actual speaking pipes and incorporating the sounds electronically within the memory of the digital organ thus having real pipe organ sound without the actual organ pipes.

== Construction ==
A pipe organ contains one or more sets of pipes, a wind system, and one or more keyboards. The pipes produce sound when pressurized air produced by the wind system passes through them. An action connects the keyboards to the pipes. Stops allow the organist to control which ranks of pipes sound at a given time. The organist operates the stops and the keyboards from the console.

=== Pipes ===
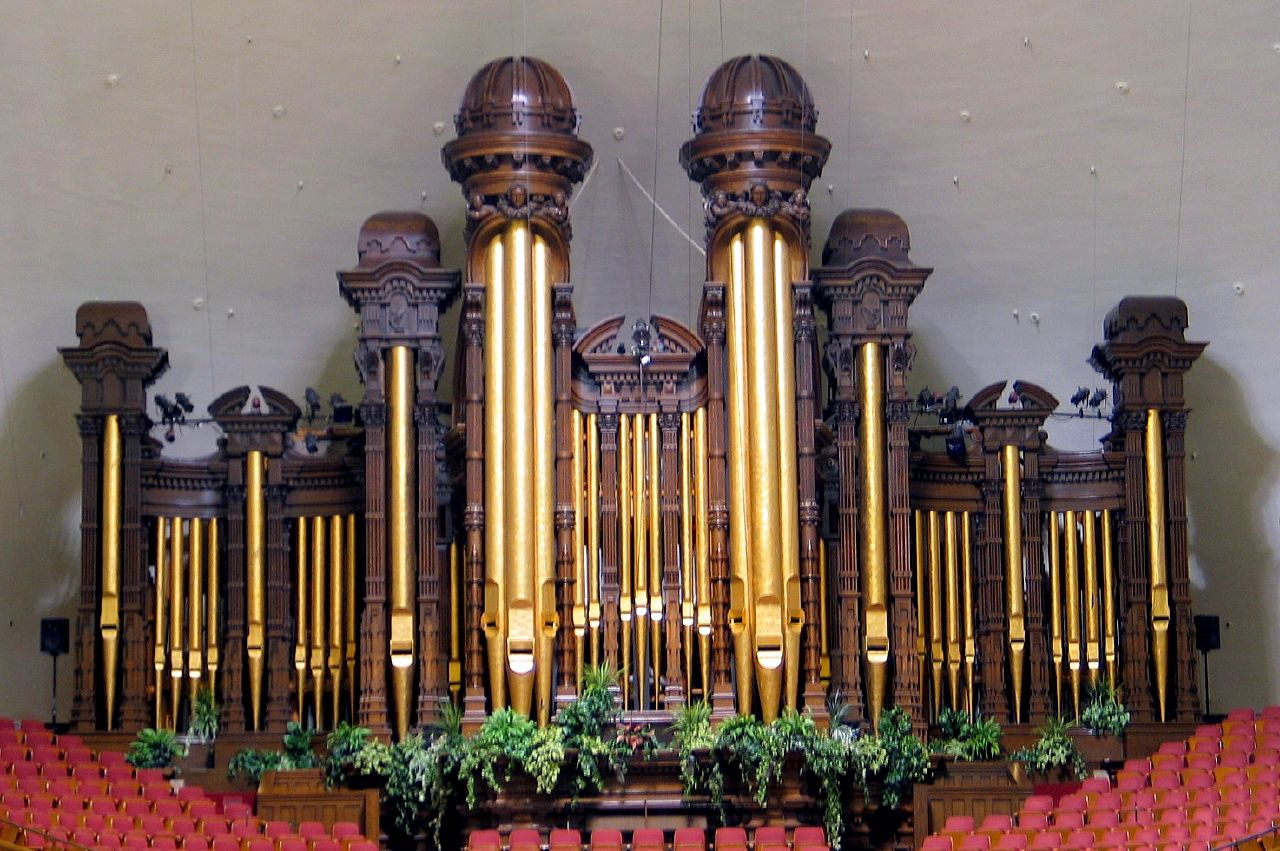
The Salt Lake Tabernacle organ found at the Salt Lake Tabernacle in Salt Lake City, Utah, has 11,623 pipes and accompanies The Tabernacle Choir at Temple Square and Orchestra at Temple Square.

Organ pipes are made from either wood or metal and produce sound ("speak") when air under pressure ("wind") is directed through them. As one pipe produces a single pitch, multiple pipes are necessary to accommodate the musical scale. The greater the length of the pipe, the lower its resulting pitch will be. The timbre and volume of the sound produced by a pipe depends on the volume of air delivered to the pipe and the manner in which it is constructed and voiced, the latter adjusted by the builder to produce the desired tone and volume. Hence a pipe's volume cannot be readily changed while playing.

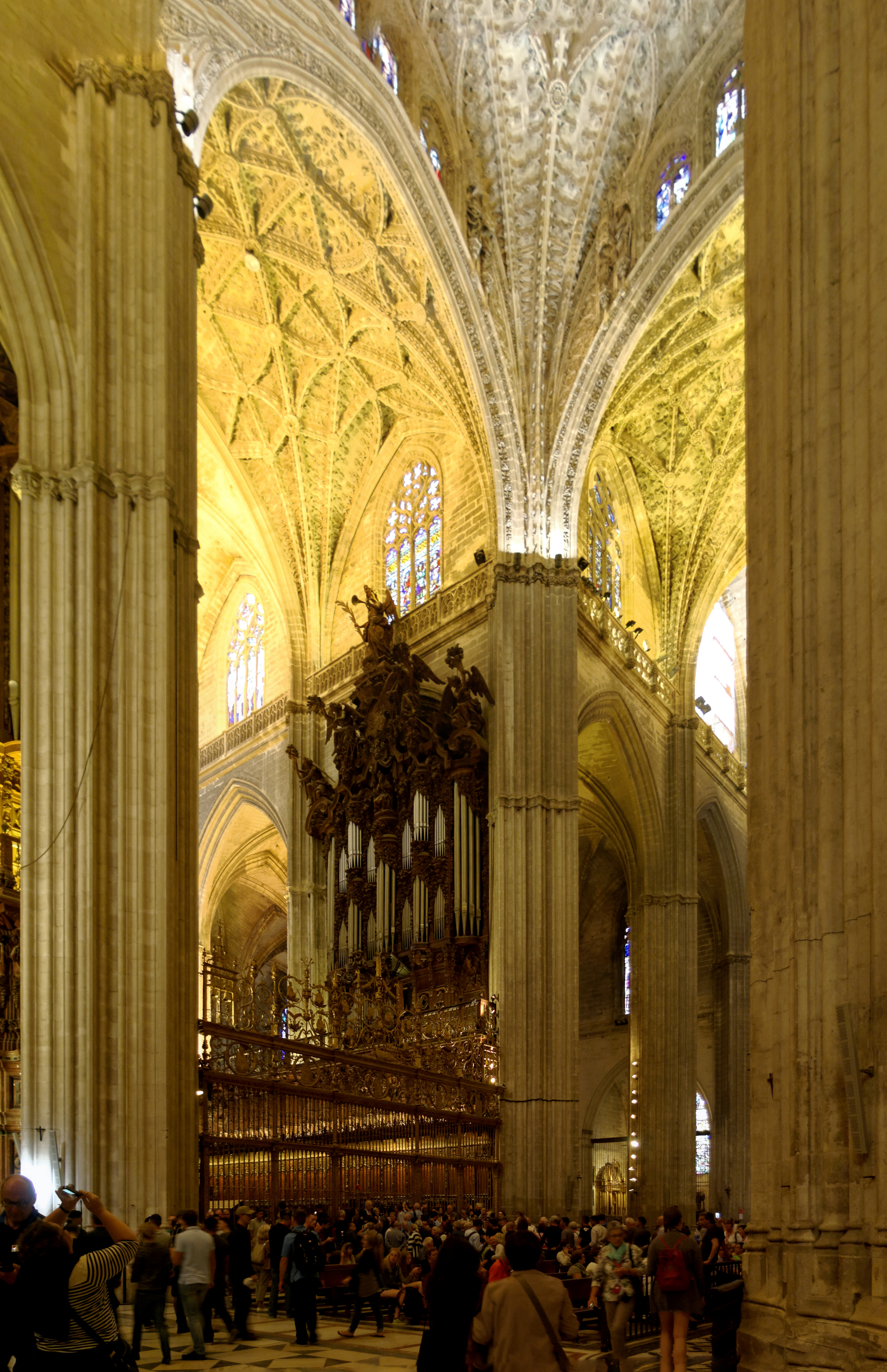
Interior of the Seville Cathedral, showing the pipes of the organ.

Organ pipes are divided into flue pipes and reed pipes according to their design and timbre. Flue pipes produce sound by forcing air through a fipple, like that of a recorder, whereas reed pipes produce sound via a beating reed, like that of a clarinet or saxophone.

Pipes are arranged by timbre and pitch into ranks. A rank is a set of pipes of the same timbre but multiple pitches (one for each note on the keyboard), which is mounted (usually vertically) onto a windchest. The stop mechanism admits air to each rank. For a given pipe to sound, the stop governing the pipe's rank must be engaged, and the key corresponding to its pitch must be depressed. Ranks of pipes are organized into groups called divisions. Each division generally is played from its own keyboard and conceptually comprises an individual instrument within the organ.

=== Action ===
An organ contains two actions, or systems of moving parts: the keys, and the stops. The key action causes wind to be admitted into an organ pipe while a key is depressed. The stop action causes a rank of pipes to be engaged (i.e. playable by the keys) while a stop is in its "on" position. An action may be mechanical, pneumatic, or electrical (or some combination of these, such as electro-pneumatic). The key action is independent of the stop action, allowing an organ to combine a mechanical key action with an electric stop action.

A key action in which the keys are connected to the windchests by only rods and levers is a mechanical or tracker action. When the organist depresses a key, the corresponding rod (called a tracker) pulls open its pallet, allowing wind to enter the pipe.

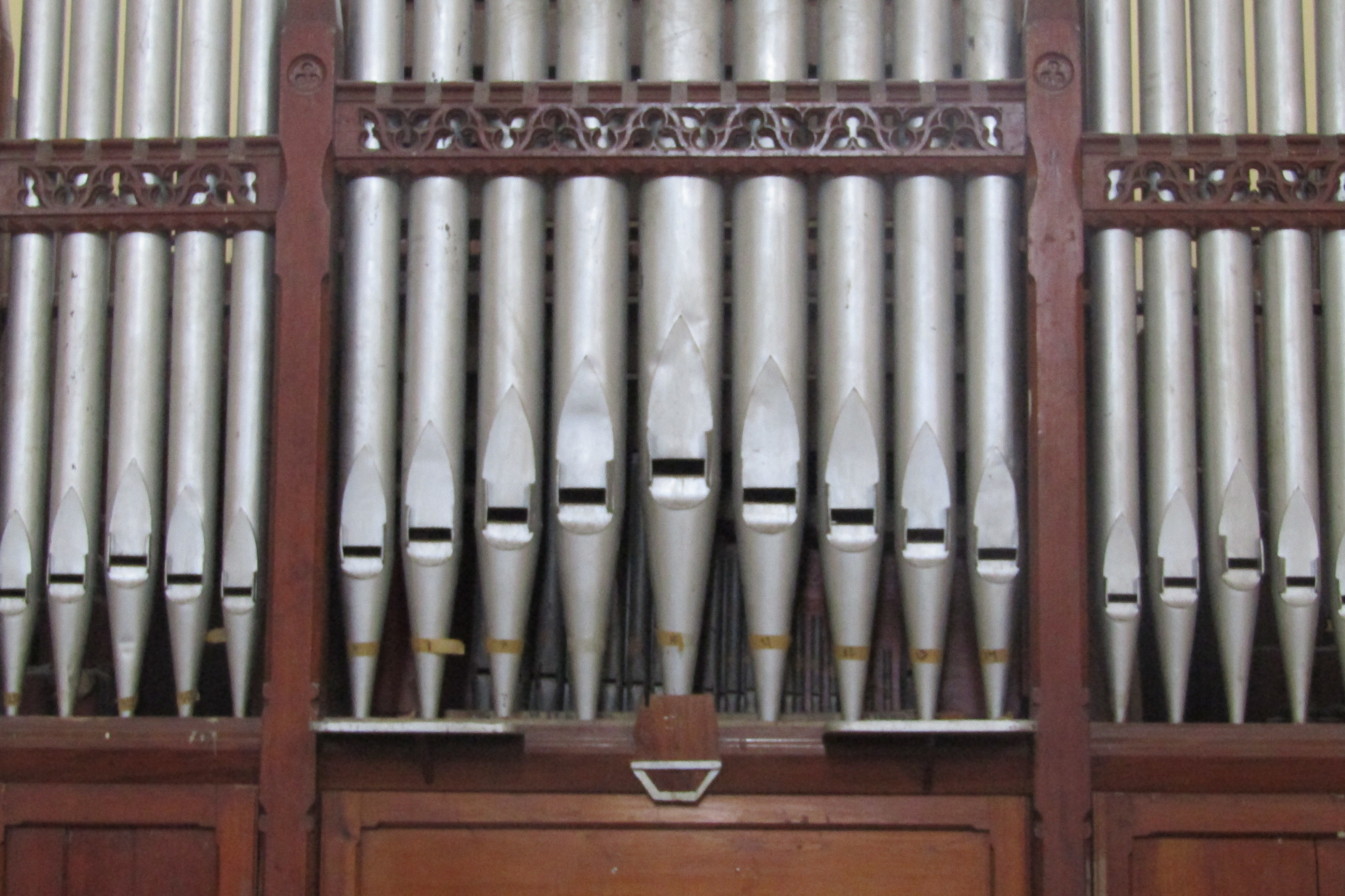
Pipes from the organ of the Comayagua Cathedral in Honduras.

In a mechanical stop action, each stop control operates a valve for a whole rank of pipes. When the organist selects a stop, the valve allows wind to reach the selected rank. The first kind of control used for this purpose was a draw stop knob, which the organist selects by pulling (or drawing) toward themself. Pulling all of the knobs thus activates all available pipes, and is the origin of the idiom "to pull out all the stops". More modern stop selectors, utilized in electric actions, are ordinary electrical switches or magnetic valves operated by a rocker tab, or both.

Tracker action has been used from antiquity to modern times. Before the pallet opens, wind pressure augments tension of the pallet spring, but once the pallet opens, only the spring tension is felt at the key. This sudden decrease of key pressure against the finger provides a "breakaway" feel.

A later development was the tubular-pneumatic action, which uses changes of pressure within lead tubing to operate pneumatic valves throughout the instrument. This allowed a lighter touch, and more flexibility in the location of the console, within a roughly 50-foot (15-m) limit. This type of construction was used in the late 19th century and early 20th century, and has had only rare application since the 1920s.

A more recent development is the electric action, which uses low voltage DC to control the key and/or stop mechanisms. Electricity may control the action indirectly by activating air pressure valves (pneumatics), in which case the action is electro-pneumatic. In such actions, an electromagnet attracts a small pilot valve which lets wind go to a bellows (the "pneumatic" component) which opens the pallet. When electricity operates the action directly without the assistance of pneumatics, it is commonly referred to as direct electric action. In this type, the electromagnet's armature carries a disc pallet.

When electrical wiring alone is used to connect the console to the windchest, electric actions allow the console to be separated at any practical distance from the rest of the organ, and to be movable. Electric stop actions can be controlled at the console by stop knobs, by pivoted tilting tablets, or rocker tabs. These are simple switches, like wall switches for room lights. Some may include electromagnets for automatic setting or resetting when combinations are selected.

Computers have made it possible to connect the console and windchests using narrow data cables instead of the much larger bundles of simple electric cables. Embedded computers in the console and near the windchests communicate with each other via various complex multiplexing syntaxes, comparable to MIDI.

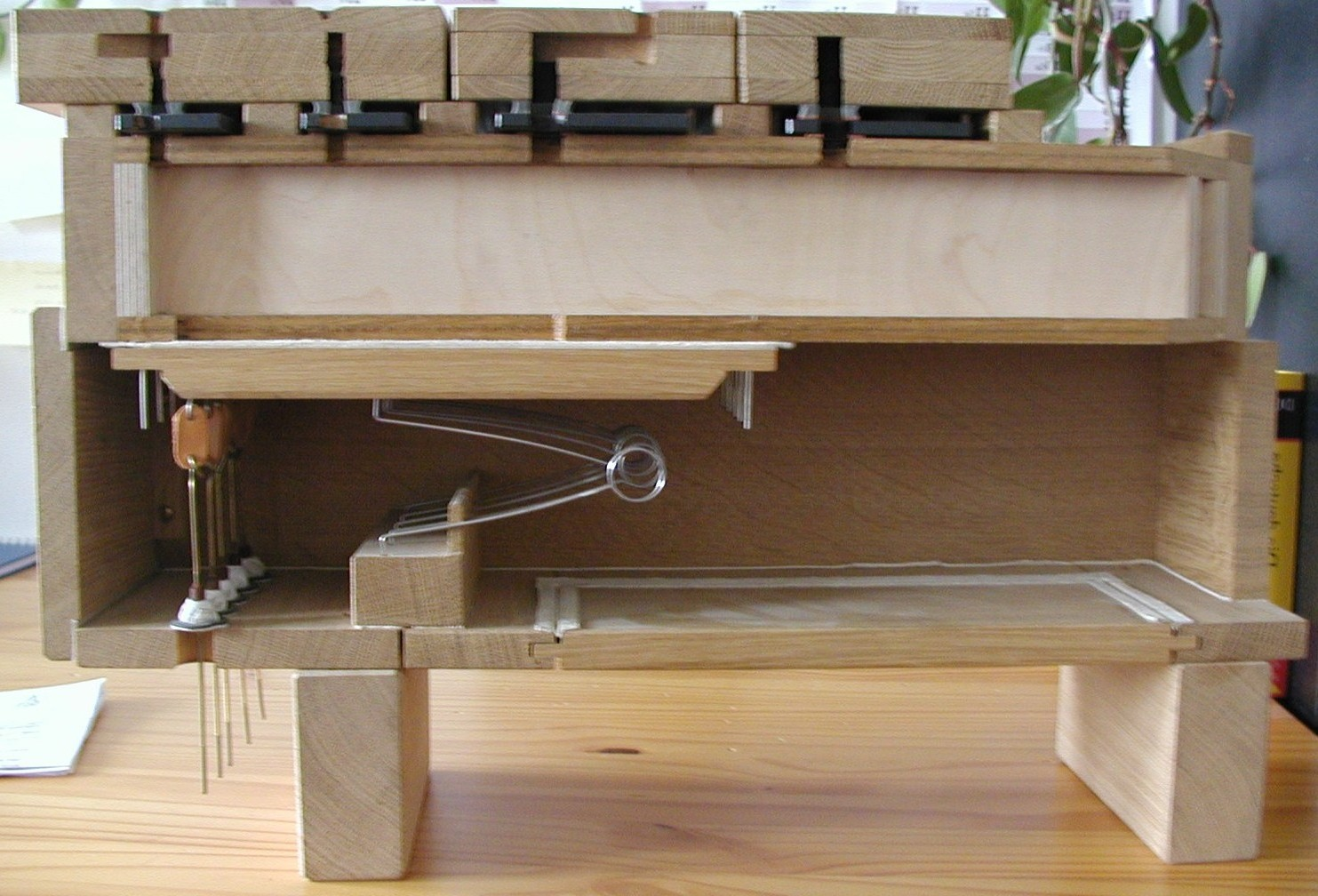
Cross-section of one note of a mechanical-action windchest. Trackers attach to the wires hanging through the bottom board at the left. A wire pulls down on the pallet (valve) against the tension of the V-shaped spring. Wind under pressure surrounds the pallet, and when it is pulled down, the wide rectangular chamber above the pallet feeds wind to all pipes of this note and stop; note the cutaway passages at the top.

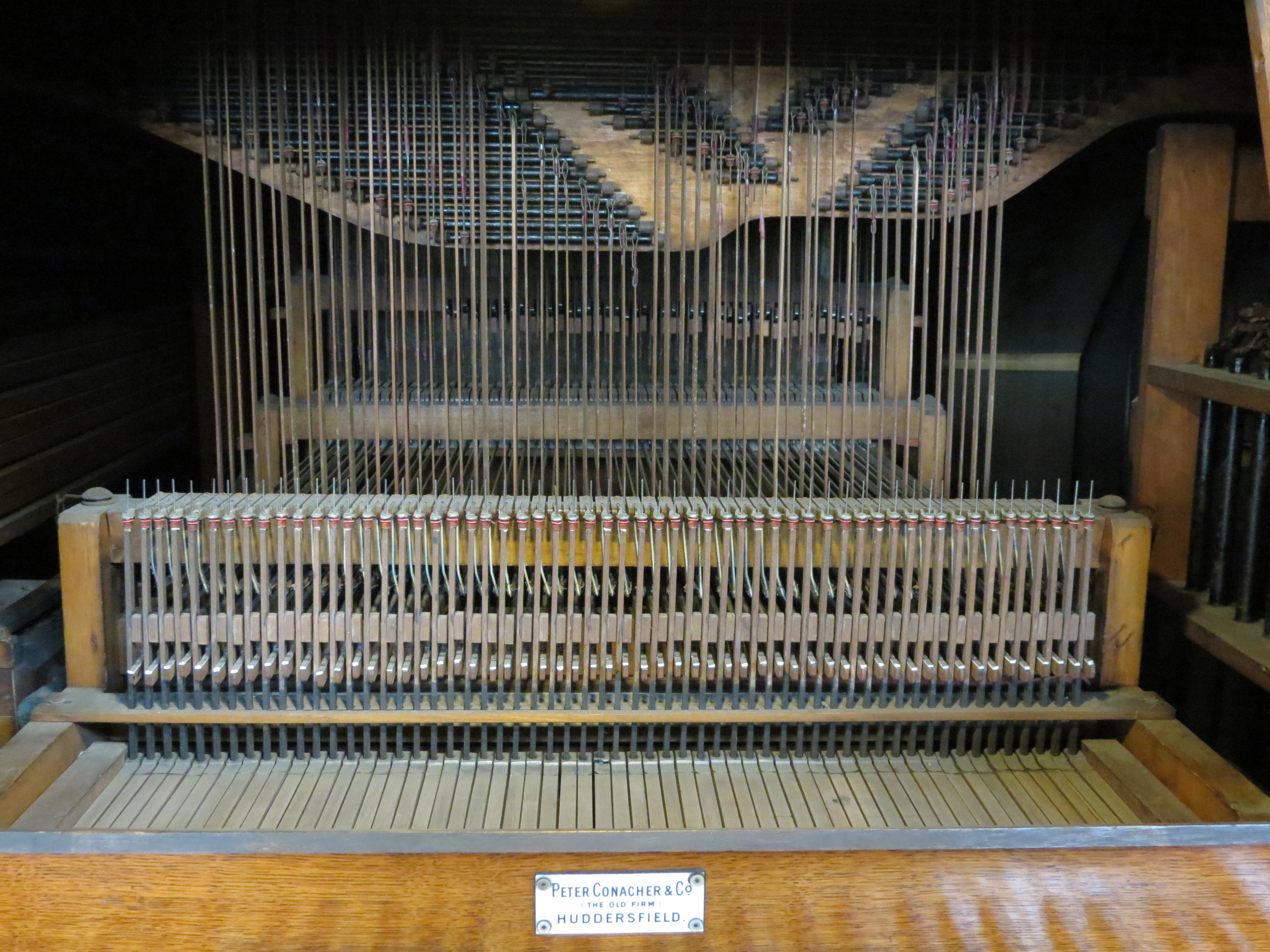
Interior of the organ at Cradley Heath Baptist Church showing the tracker action. The black rods, called rollers, rotate to transmit movement sideways to line up with the pipes.

Schematic animation of a mechanical-action windchest with three ranks of pipes

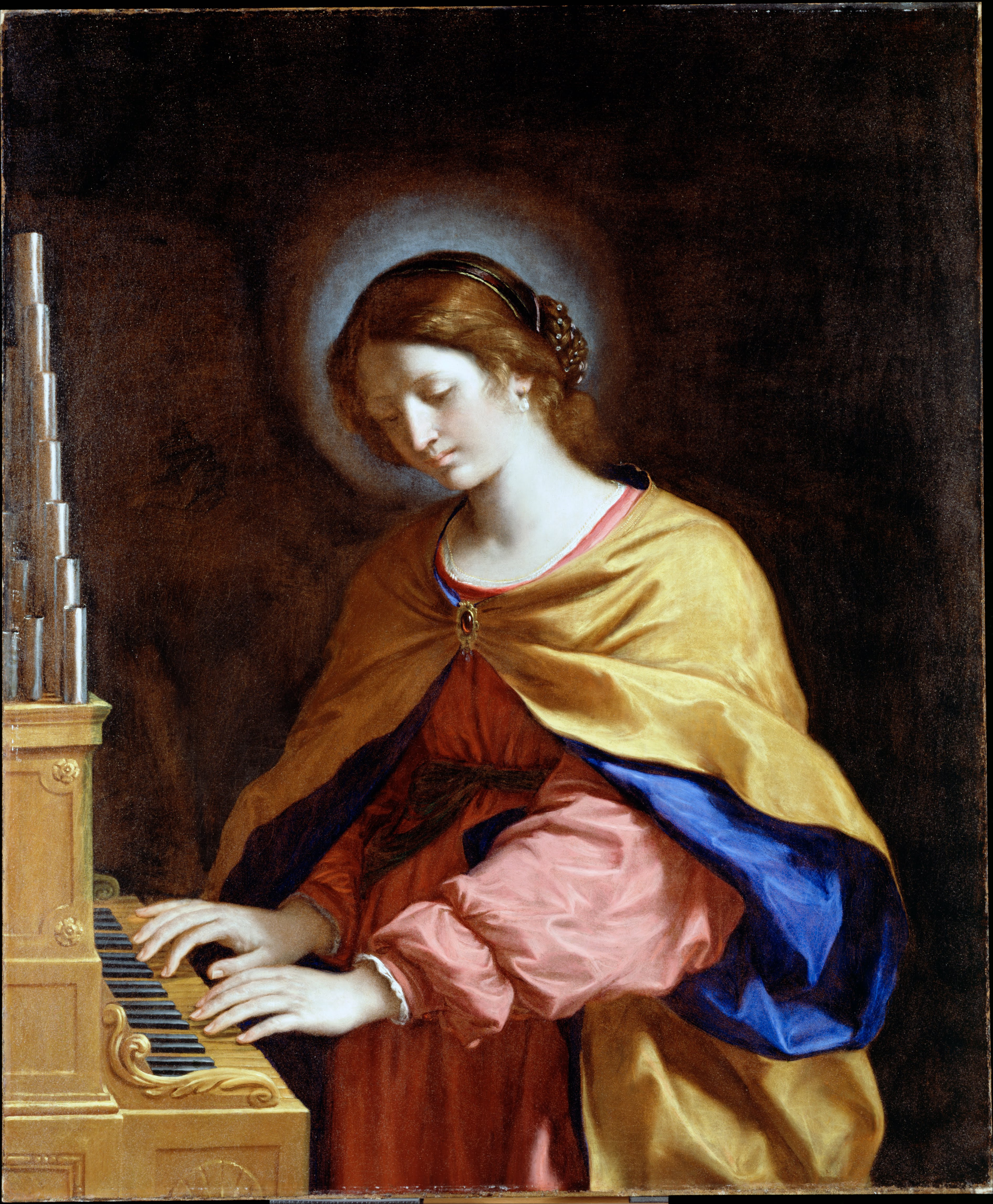
Saint Cecilia, patron saint of music, depicted playing the pipe organ

=== Wind system ===
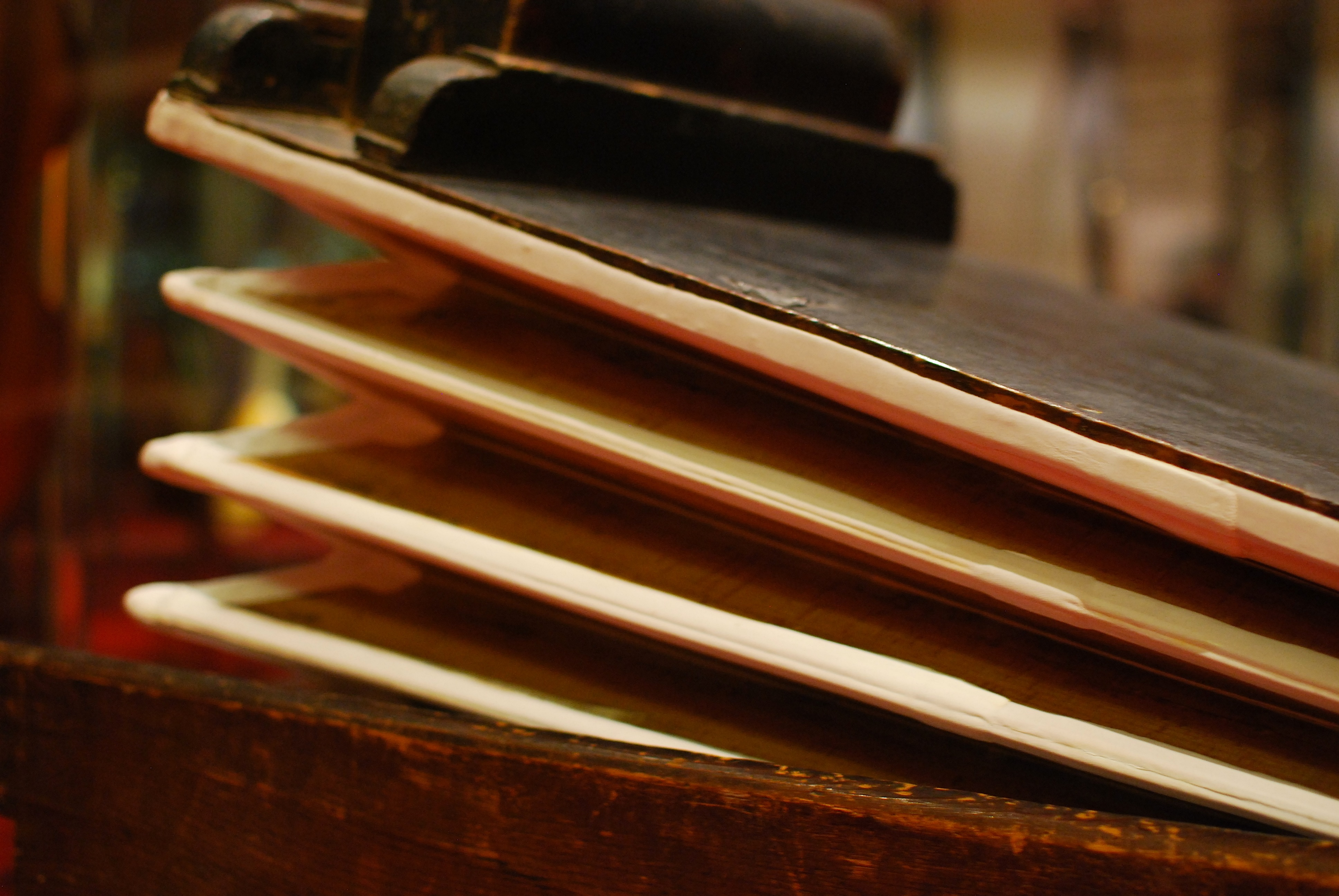
Bellows of a pipe organ at Museu de la Música de Barcelona

The wind system consists of the parts that produce, store, and deliver wind to the pipes. Pipe organ wind pressures are on the order of 0.10 psi (0.69 kPa). Organ builders traditionally measure organ wind using a water U-tube manometer, which gives the pressure as the difference in water levels in the two legs of the manometer. The difference in water level is proportional to the difference in pressure between the wind and the atmosphere. The 0.10 psi above would register as 2.75 inches of water (70 mmAq). An Italian organ from the Renaissance period may be on only 2.2 inches (56 mm), while (in the extreme) solo stops in some large 20th-century organs may require up to 50 inches (1,300 mm). In isolated, extreme cases, some stops have been voiced on 100 inches (2,500 mm). (Note: The Boardwalk Hall Auditorium Organ in Atlantic City has four stops on 100 inches and ten stops on 50. Atlantic City Convention Hall Organ. Oddmusic.com. Retrieved on 4 July 2007.)

With the exception of water organs, playing the organ before the invention of motors required at least one person to operate the bellows. When signaled by the organist, a calcant would operate a set of bellows, supplying the organ with wind. Rather than hire a calcant, an organist might practise on some other instrument such as a clavichord or harpsichord. By the mid-19th-century bellows were also operated by water engines, steam engines or gasoline engines. Starting in the 1860s bellows were gradually replaced by rotating turbines which were later directly connected to electrical motors. This made it possible for organists to practice regularly on the organ. Most organs, both new and historic, have electric blowers, although some can still be operated manually. The wind supplied is stored in one or more regulators to maintain a constant pressure in the windchests until the action allows it to flow into the pipes.

=== Stops ===
Each stop usually controls one rank of pipes, although mixtures and undulating stops (such as the Voix céleste) control multiple ranks. The name of the stop reflects not only the stop's timbre and construction, but also the style of the organ in which it resides. For example, the names on an organ built in the north German Baroque style generally will be derived from the German language, while the names of similar stops on an organ in the French Romantic style will usually be French. Most countries tend to use only their own languages for stop nomenclature. English-speaking nations as well as Japan are more receptive to foreign nomenclature. Stop names are not standardized: two otherwise identical stops from different organs may have different names.

To facilitate a large range of timbres, organ stops exist at different pitch levels. A stop that sounds at unison pitch when a key is depressed is called an 8′ (pronounced "eight-foot") pitch. This refers to the speaking length of the lowest-sounding pipe in that rank, which is approximately eight feet (2.4 m). For the same reason, a stop that sounds an octave higher is at 4′ pitch, and one that sounds two octaves higher is at 2′ pitch. Likewise, a stop that sounds an octave lower than unison pitch is at 16′ pitch, and one that sounds two octaves lower is at 32′ pitch. Stops of different pitch levels are designed to be played simultaneously.

The label on a stop knob or rocker tab indicates the stop's name and its pitch in feet. Stops that control multiple ranks display a Roman numeral indicating the number of ranks present, instead of pitch. Thus, a stop labelled "Open Diapason 8′" is a single-rank diapason stop sounding at 8′ pitch. A stop labelled "Mixture V" is a five-rank mixture.

Sometimes, a single rank of pipes may be able to be controlled by several stops, allowing the rank to be played at multiple pitches or on multiple manuals. Such a rank is said to be unified or borrowed. For example, an 8′ Diapason rank may also be made available as a 4′ Octave. When both of these stops are selected and a key (for example, c′) (Note: This article uses the Helmholtz pitch notation to indicate specific pitches.) is pressed, two pipes of the same rank will sound: the pipe normally corresponding to the key played (c′), and the pipe one octave above that (c″). Because the 8′ rank does not have enough pipes to sound the top octave of the keyboard at 4′ pitch, it is common for an extra octave of pipes used only for the borrowed 4′ stop to be added. In this case, the full rank of pipes (now an extended rank) is one octave longer than the keyboard. (Note: The purpose of extended ranks and of their being borrowed is to save on the number of pipes. For example, without unification, three stops may use 183 pipes. With unification three stops may borrow one extended rank of 85 pipes.)

Special unpitched stops also appear in some organs. Among these are the Zimbelstern (a wheel of rotating bells), the nightingale (a pipe submerged in a small pool of water, creating the sound of a bird warbling when wind is admitted), and the effet d'orage ("thunder effect", a device that sounds the lowest bass pipes simultaneously). Standard orchestral percussion instruments such as the drum, chimes, celesta, and harp have also been imitated in organ building.

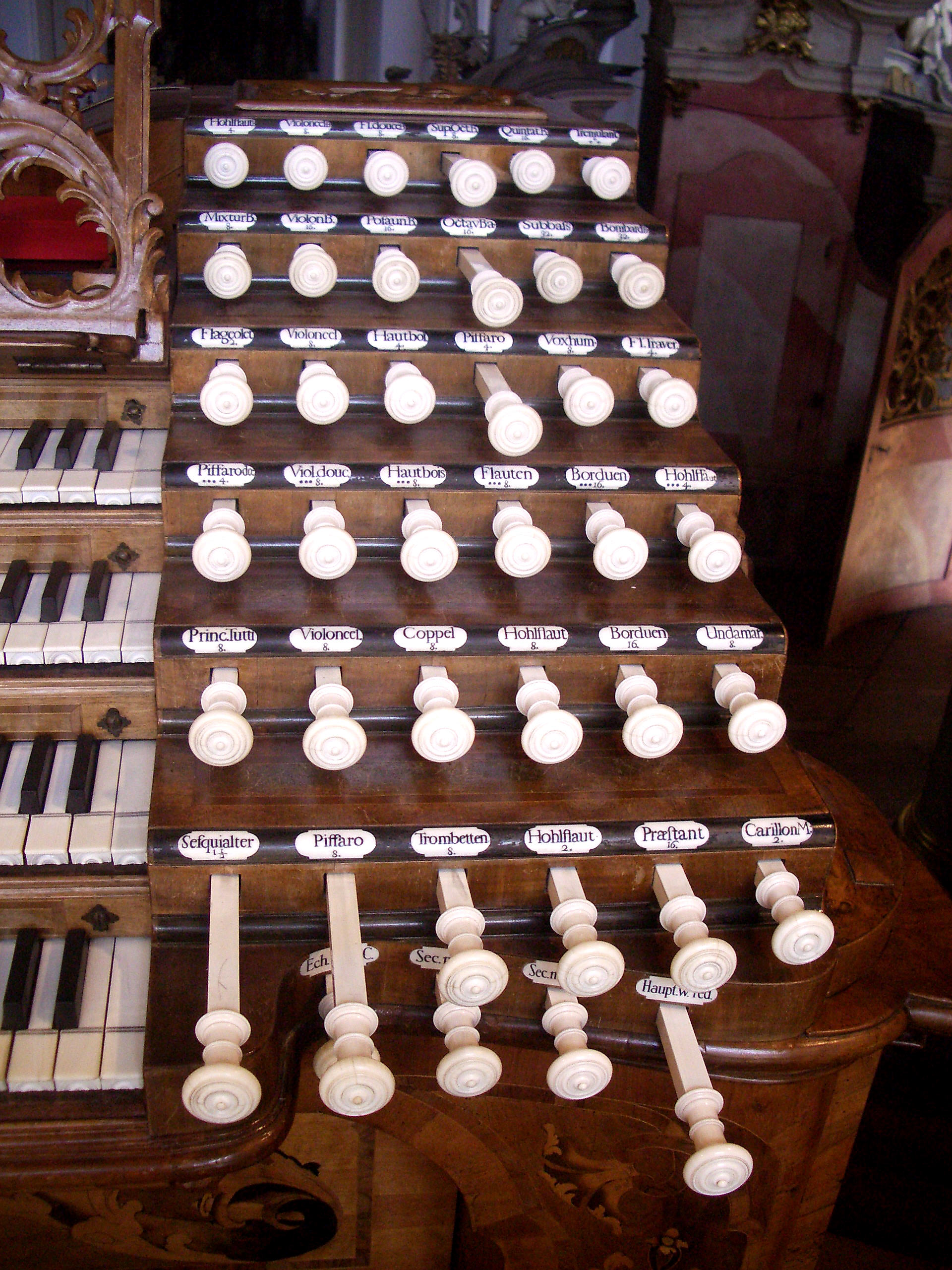
Stop knobs of the Baroque organ in Weingarten, Germany

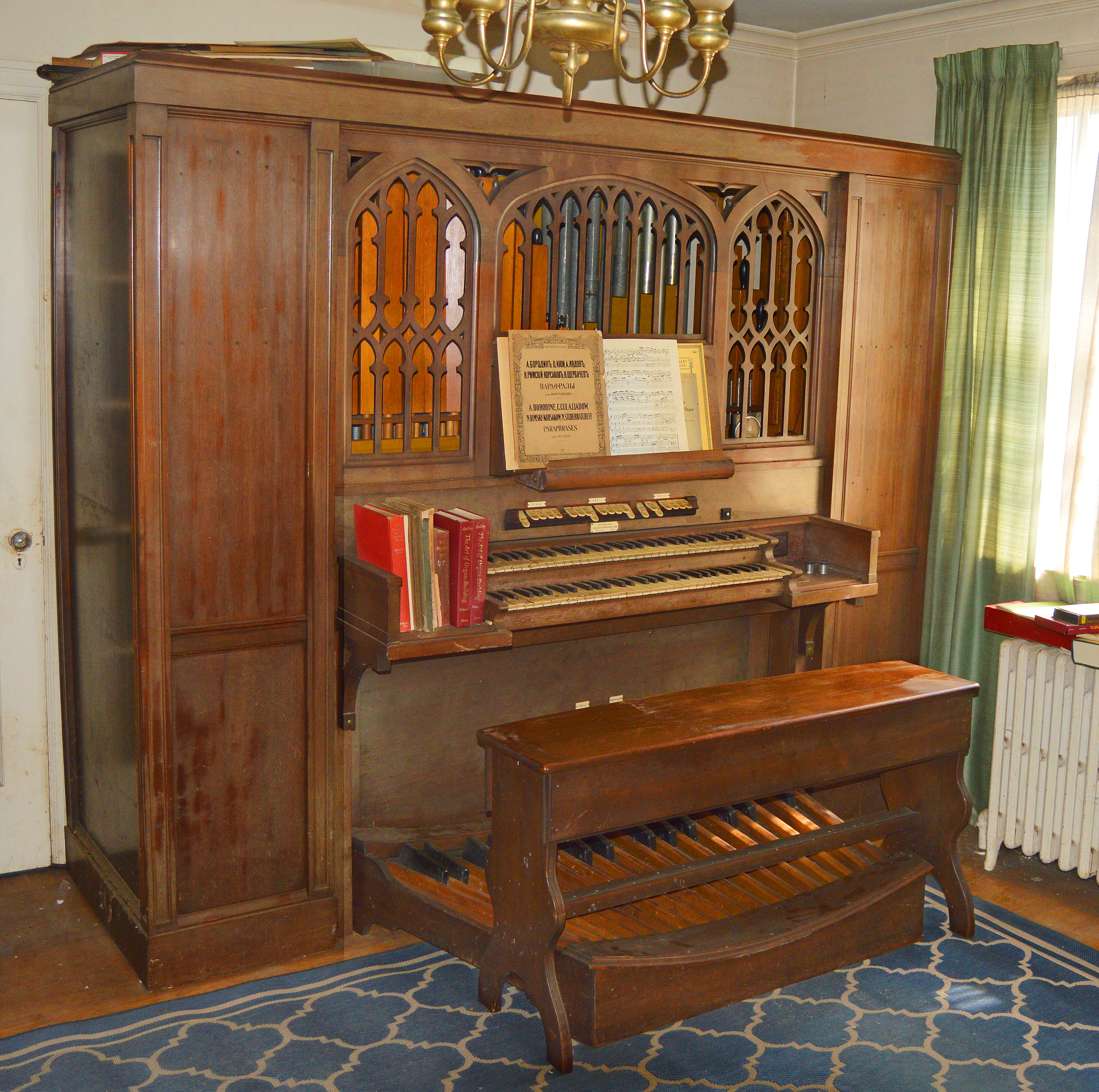
M.P. Möller three-rank chapel organ (1936)

=== Console ===
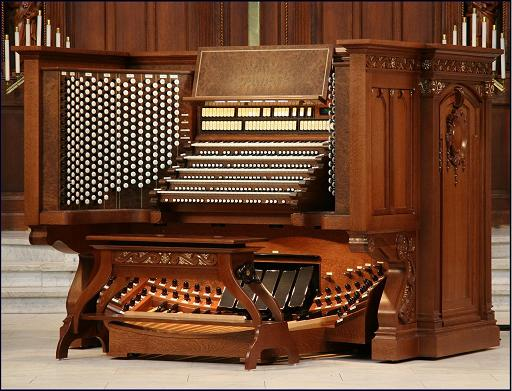
The five-manual, 522-stop detached console at the United States Naval Academy Chapel crafted by R. A. Colby, Inc. (Note: Organ built by M. P. Moller, 1940.)

The controls available to the organist, including the keyboards, couplers, expression pedals, stops, and registration aids are accessed from the console. The console is either built into the organ case or detached from it.

==== Keyboards ====
Keyboards played by the hands are known as manuals (from the Latin mănus, meaning "hand"). The keyboard played by the feet is a pedalboard (from the Latin pēs, pĕdis, meaning "foot"). Every organ has at least one manual (most have two or more), and most have a pedalboard. Each keyboard is named for a particular division of the organ (a group of ranks) and generally controls only the stops from that division. The range of the keyboards has varied widely across time and between countries. Most current specifications call for two or more manuals with sixty-one notes (five octaves, from C to c⁗) and a pedalboard with thirty or thirty-two notes (two and a half octaves, from C to f′ or g′).

==== Couplers ====
A coupler allows the stops of one division to be played from the keyboard of another division. For example, a coupler labelled "Swell to Great" allows the stops drawn in the Swell division to be played on the Great manual. This coupler is a unison coupler, because it causes the pipes of the Swell division to sound at the same pitch as the keys played on the Great manual. Coupling allows stops from different divisions to be combined to create various tonal effects. It also allows every stop of the organ to be played simultaneously from one manual.

Octave couplers, which add the pipes an octave above (super-octave) or below (sub-octave) each note that is played, may operate on one division only (for example, the Swell super octave, which adds the octave above what is played on the Swell to itself), or act as a coupler to another keyboard (for example, the Swell super-octave to Great, which adds to the Great manual the ranks of the Swell division an octave above what is played).

In addition, larger organs may use unison off couplers, which prevent the stops pulled in a particular division from sounding at their normal pitch. These can be used in combination with octave couplers to create innovative aural effects, and can also be used to rearrange the order of the manuals to make specific pieces easier to play.

==== Enclosure and expression pedals ====
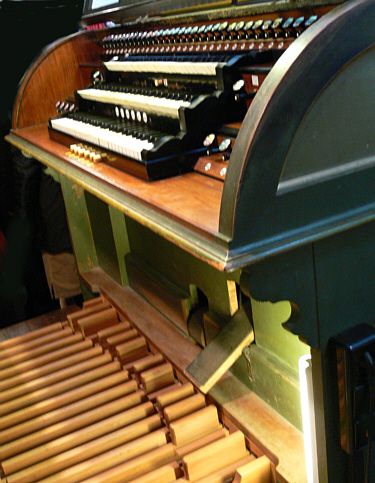
The console of the organ in Salem Minster in Salem, Germany. (Note: Organ built by Wilhelm Schwarz, 1901) The expression pedal is visible directly above the pedalboard.

Enclosure refers to a system that allows for the control of volume without requiring the addition or subtraction of stops. In a two-manual organ with Great and Swell divisions, the Swell will be enclosed. In larger organs, parts or all of the Choir and Solo divisions may also be enclosed. The pipes of an enclosed division are placed in a chamber generally called the swell box. At least one side of the box is constructed from horizontal or vertical palettes known as swell shades, which operate in a similar way to Venetian blinds; their position can be adjusted from the console. When the swell shades are open, more sound is heard than when they are closed. Sometimes the shades are exposed, but they are often concealed behind a row of facade-pipes or a grill.

The most common method of controlling the louvers is the balanced swell pedal. This device is usually placed above the centre of the pedalboard and is configured to rotate away from the organist from a near-vertical position (in which the shades are closed) to a near-horizontal position (in which the shades are open). An organ may also have a similar-looking crescendo pedal, found alongside any expression pedals. Pressing the crescendo pedal forward cumulatively activates the stops of the organ, starting with the softest and ending with the loudest; pressing it backward reverses this process.

==== Combination action ====
Organ stops can be combined in many permutations, resulting in a great variety of sounds. A combination action can be used to switch instantly from one combination of stops (called a registration) to another. Combination actions feature small buttons called pistons that can be pressed by the organist, generally located beneath the keys of each manual (thumb pistons) or above the pedalboard (toe pistons). The pistons may be divisional (affecting only a single division) or general (affecting all the divisions), and are either preset by the organ builder or can be altered by the organist. Modern combination actions operate via computer memory, and can store several channels of registrations.

=== Casing ===
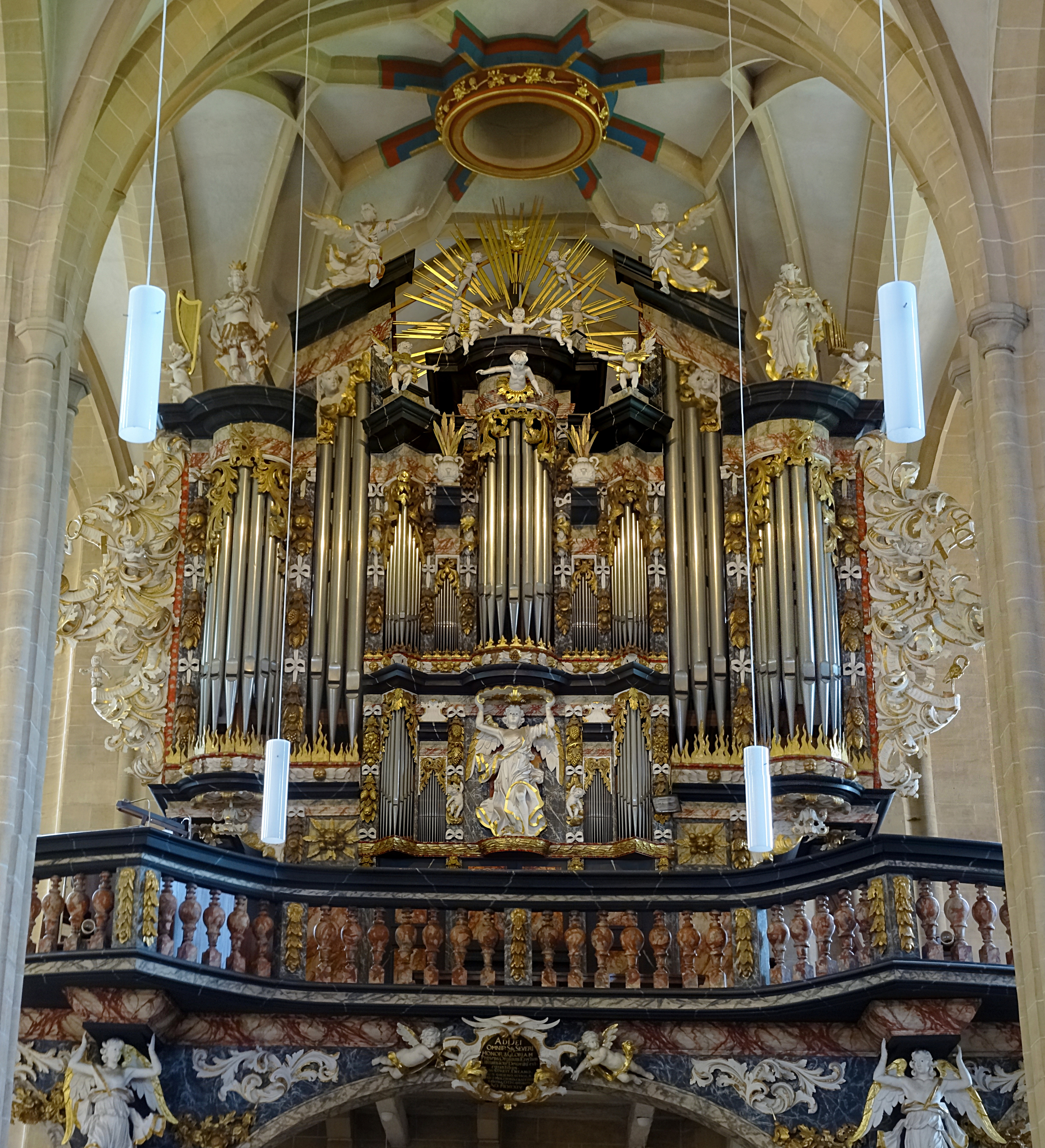
The organ of the Severikirche in Erfurt, Thuringia, Germany has a highly decorative case with ornate carvings and cherubs.

The pipes, action, and wind system are almost always contained in a case, the design of which also may incorporate the console. The case blends the organ's sound and aids in projecting it into the room. The case is often designed to complement the building's architectural style and it may contain ornamental carvings and other decorations. The visible portion of the case, called the façade, will most often contain pipes, which may be either sounding pipes or dummy pipes solely for decoration. The façade pipes may be plain, burnished, gilded, or painted and are usually referred to as (en) montre within the context of the French organ school.

Organ cases occasionally feature a few ranks of pipes protruding horizontally from the case in the manner of a row of trumpets. These are referred to as pipes en chamade and are particularly common in organs of the Iberian peninsula and large 20th-century instruments.

Many organs, particularly those built in the early 20th century, are contained in one or more rooms called organ chambers. Because sound does not project from a chamber into the room as clearly as from a freestanding organ case, enchambered organs may sound muffled and distant. For this reason, some modern builders, particularly those building instruments specializing in polyphony rather than Romantic compositions, avoid this unless the architecture of the room makes it necessary.

=== Tuning and regulation ===
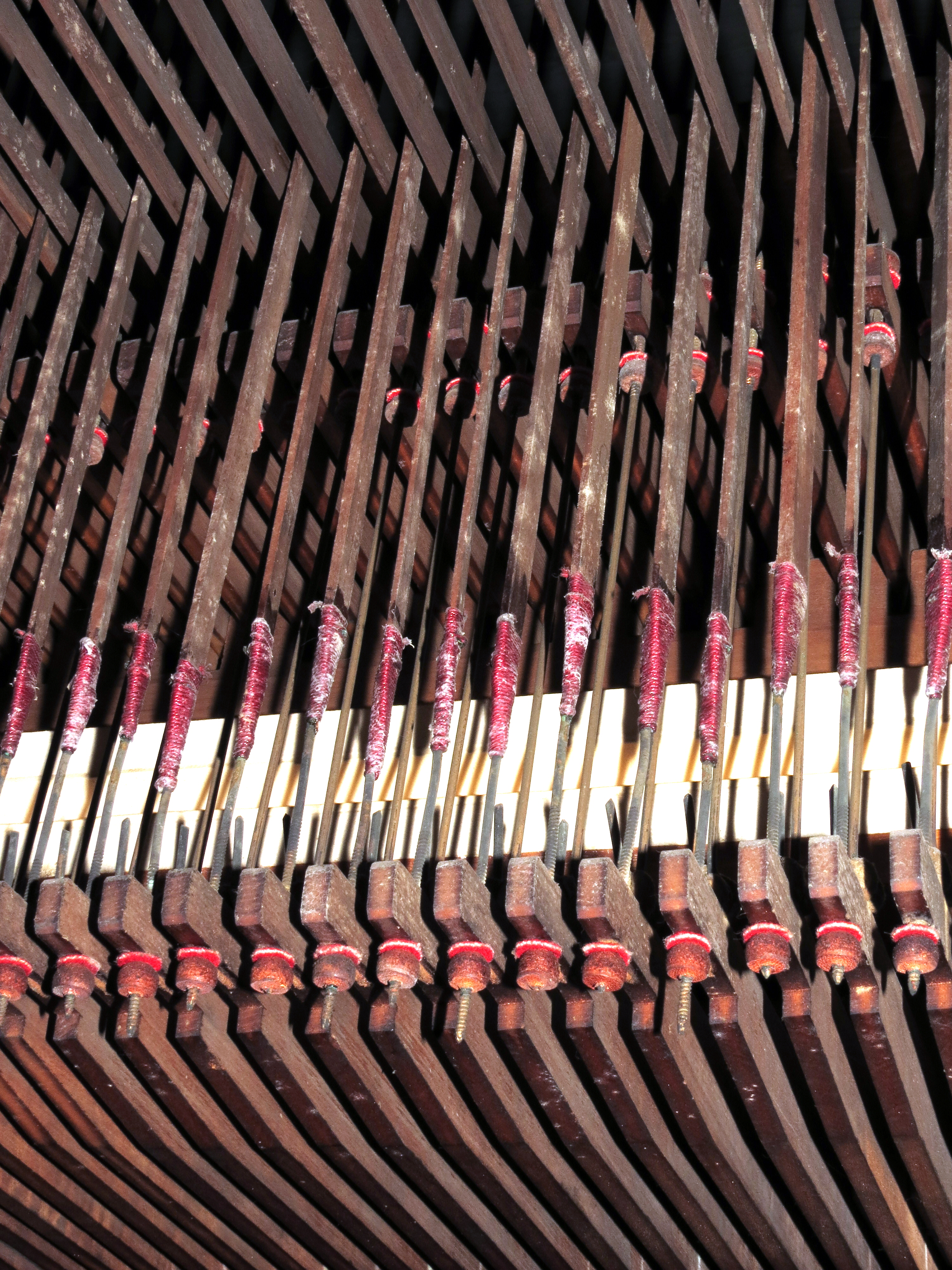
Tracker action showing adjusters on tracker ends which engage with the keys of the great organ

The goal of tuning a pipe organ is to adjust the pitch of each pipe so that they all sound in tune with each other. How the pitch of each pipe is adjusted depends on the type and construction of that pipe.

Regulation adjusts the action so that all pipes sound correctly. If the regulation is wrongly set, the keys may be at different heights, some pipes may sound when the keys are not pressed (a "cipher"), or pipes may not sound when a key is pressed. Tracker action, for example in the organ of Cradley Heath Baptist Church, includes adjustment nuts on the wire ends of the wooden trackers, which have the effect of changing the effective length of each tracker.

== Repertoire ==
The main development of organ repertoire has progressed along with that of the organ itself, leading to distinctive national styles of composition. Because organs are commonly found in churches and synagogues, the organ repertoire includes a large amount of sacred music, which is accompanimental (choral anthems, congregational hymns, liturgical elements, etc.) as well as solo in nature (chorale preludes, hymn versets designed for alternatim use, etc.). The organ's secular repertoire includes preludes, fugues, sonatas, organ symphonies, suites, and transcriptions of orchestral works.

Although most countries whose music falls into the Western tradition have contributed to the organ repertoire, France and Germany in particular have produced exceptionally large amounts of organ music. There is also an extensive repertoire from the Netherlands, England, and the United States.

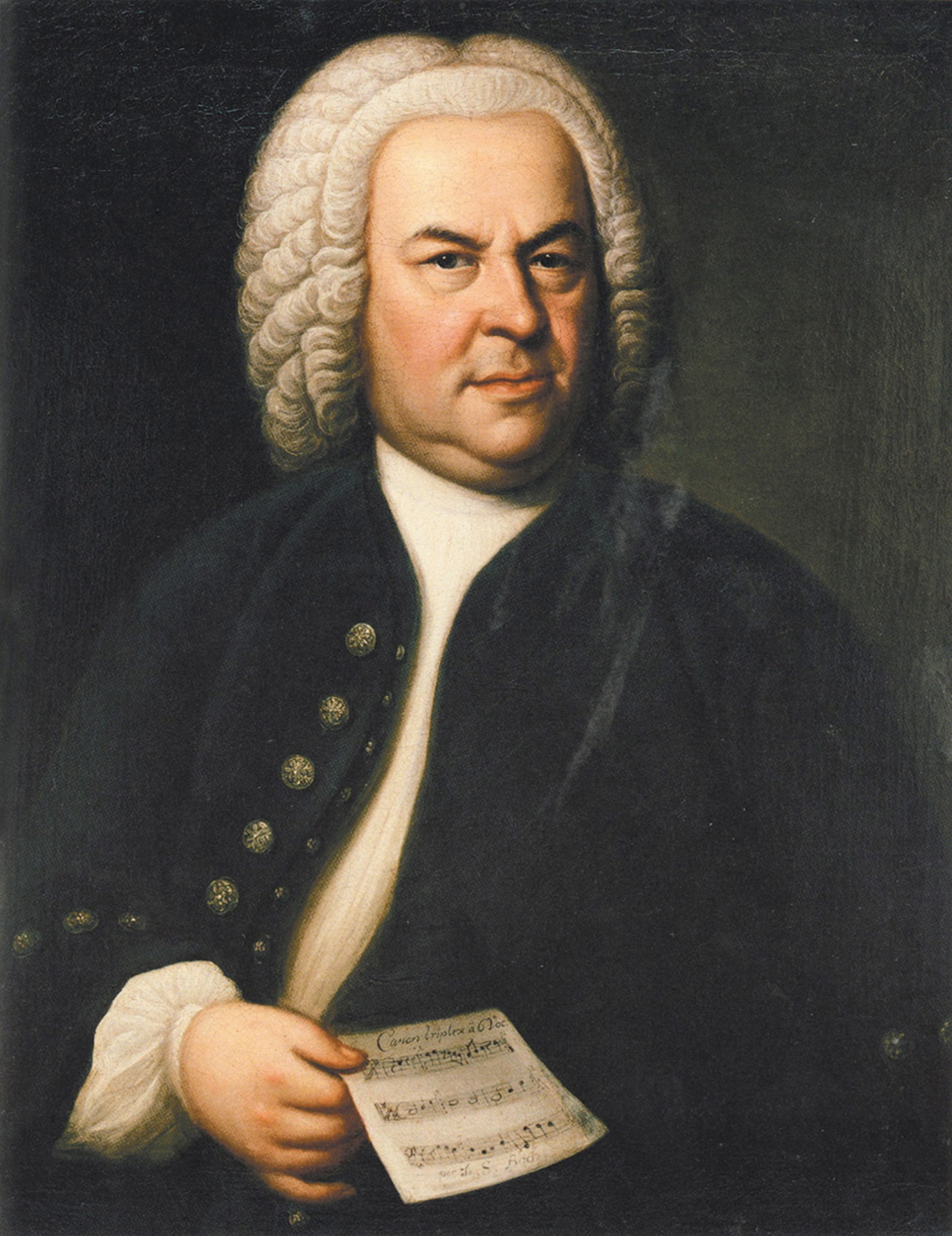
The organ music of Johann Sebastian Bach (by Haussmann, c. 1748) forms an important part of the instrument's repertoire.

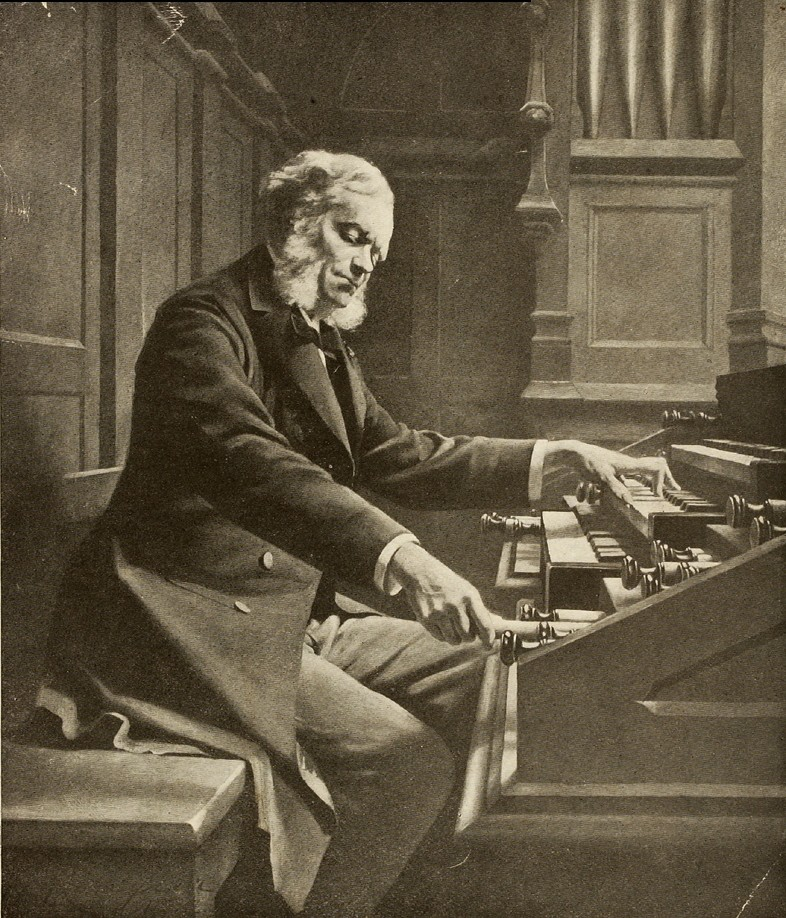
César Franck (by Rongier, 1888) at the console of the organ at Saint Clotilde, Paris

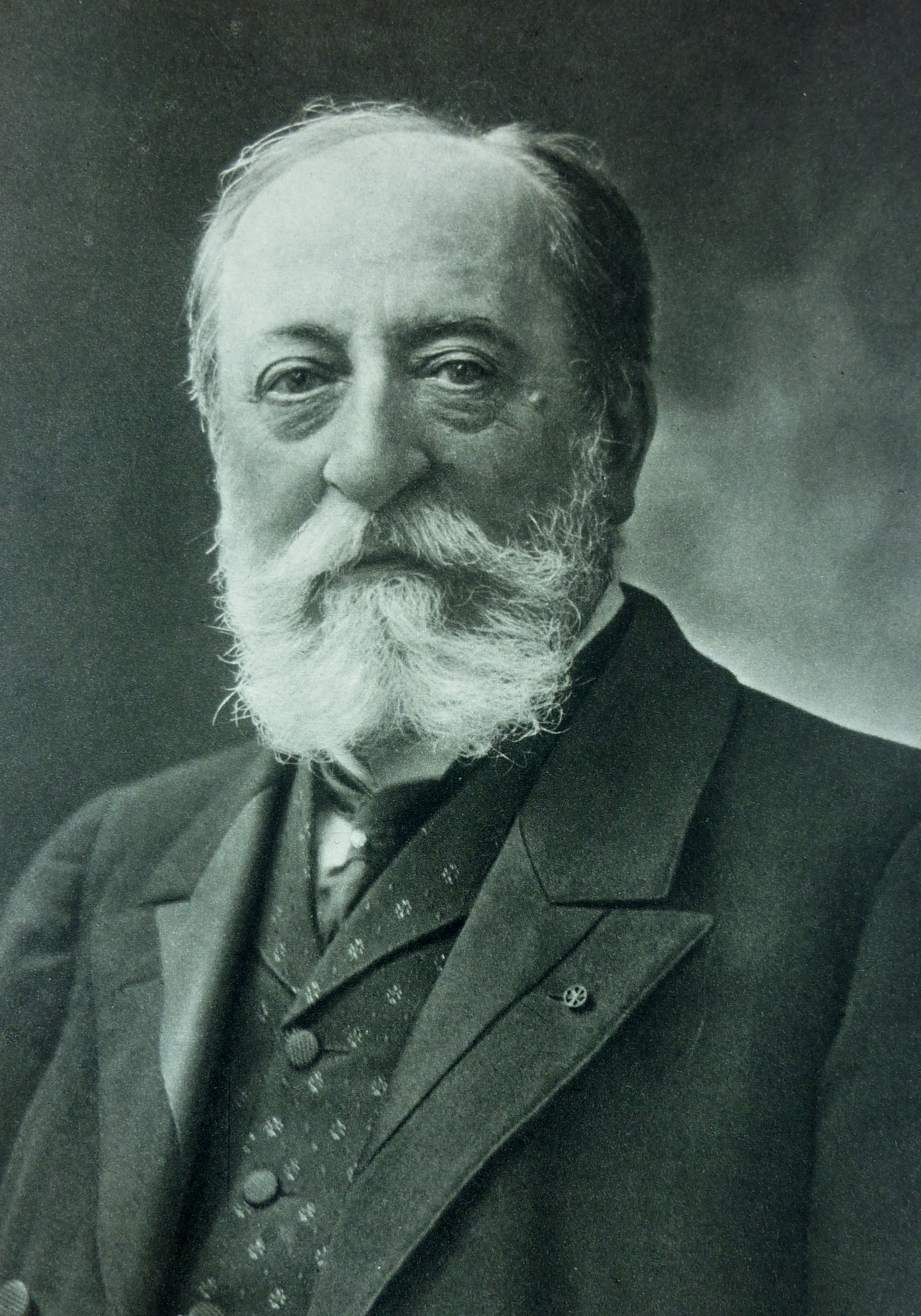
Camille Saint-Saëns (by Nadar) famously included a prominent organ part in his Symphony No. 3, which is thus sometimes known as the Organ Symphony

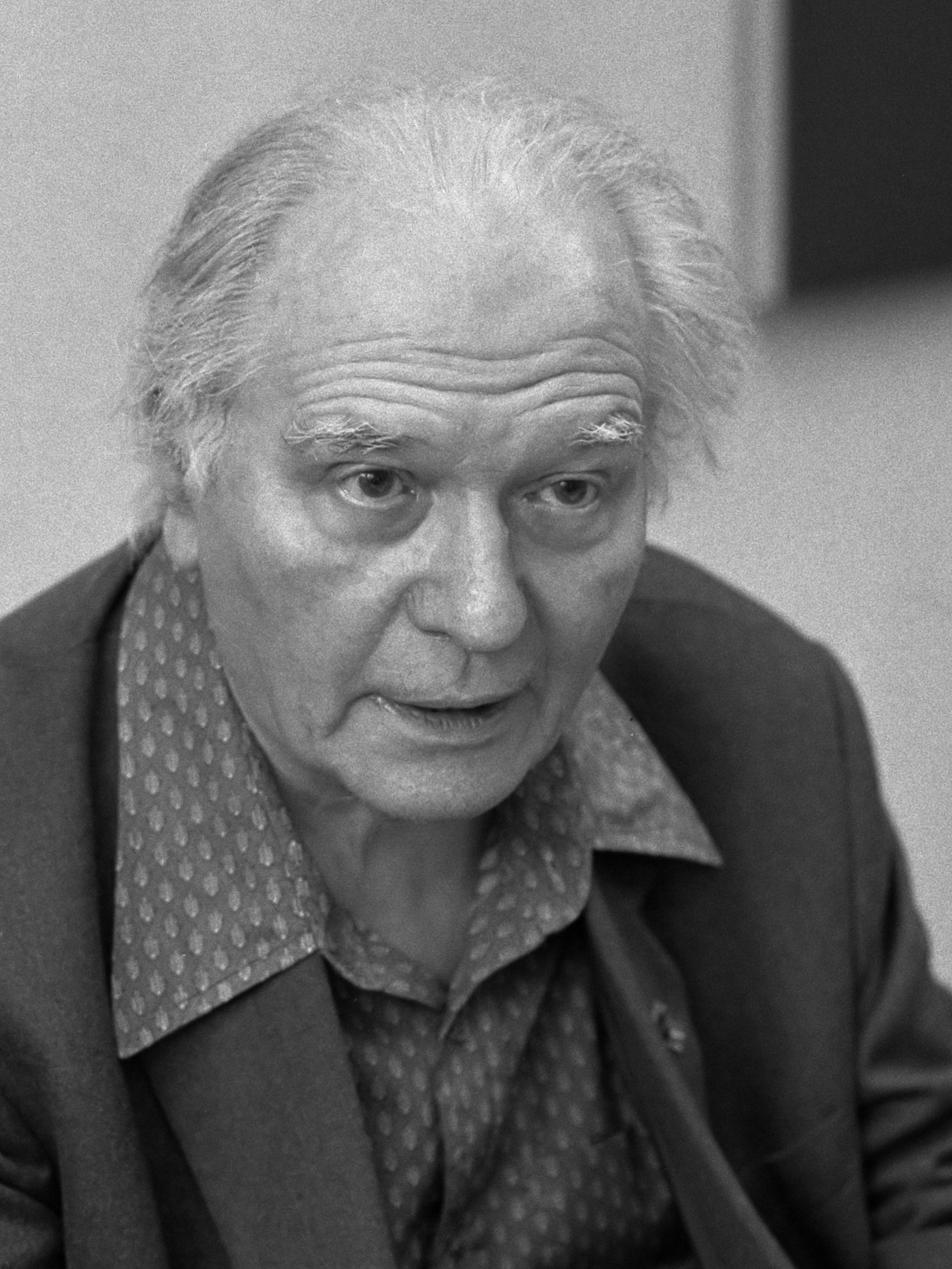
The composer Olivier Messiaen (1986) championed an innovative and unprecedented approach to organ music

=== Early music ===
Before the Baroque era, keyboard music generally was not written for one instrument or another, but rather was written to be played on any keyboard instrument. For this reason, much of the organ's repertoire through the Renaissance period is the same as that of the harpsichord. Pre-Renaissance keyboard music is found in compiled manuscripts that may include compositions from a variety of regions. The oldest of these sources is the Robertsbridge Codex, dating from about 1360. The Buxheimer Orgelbuch, which dates from about 1470 and was compiled in Germany, includes intabulations of vocal music by the English composer John Dunstaple. The earliest Italian organ music is found in the Faenza Codex, dating from 1420.

In the Renaissance period, Dutch composers such as Jan Pieterszoon Sweelinck composed both fantasias and psalm settings. Sweelinck in particular developed a rich collection of keyboard figuration that influenced subsequent composers. The Italian composer Claudio Merulo wrote in the typical Italian genres of the toccata, the canzona, and the ricercar. In Spain, the works of Antonio de Cabezón began the most prolific period of Spanish organ composition, which culminated with Juan Cabanilles.

=== Common practice period ===
Robert Huw Morgan plays Bach's Fantasia and Fugue in G minor on the Fisk-Nanney organ at the Stanford Memorial Church in Stanford, California.

Early Baroque organ music in Germany was highly contrapuntal. Sacred organ music was based on chorales: composers such as Samuel Scheidt and Heinrich Scheidemann wrote chorale preludes, chorale fantasias, and chorale motets. Near the end of the Baroque era, the chorale prelude and the partita became mixed, forming the chorale partita. This genre was developed by Georg Böhm, Johann Pachelbel, and Dieterich Buxtehude. The primary type of free-form piece in this period was the praeludium, as exemplified in the works of Matthias Weckmann, Nicolaus Bruhns, Böhm, and Buxtehude. The organ music of Johann Sebastian Bach fused characteristics of every national tradition and historical style in his large-scale preludes and fugues and chorale-based works. George Frideric Handel composed the first organ concertos.

In France, organ music developed during the Baroque era through the music of Jean Titelouze, François Couperin, and Nicolas de Grigny. Because the French organ of the 17th and early 18th centuries was very standardized, a conventional set of registrations developed for its repertoire. The music of French composers (and Italian composers such as Girolamo Frescobaldi) was written for use during the Mass. Very little secular organ music was composed in France and Italy during the Baroque period; the written repertoire is almost exclusively intended for liturgical use. In England, composers such as John Blow and John Stanley wrote multi-sectional free works for liturgical use called voluntaries through the 19th century.

Organ music was seldom written in the Classical era, as composers preferred the piano with its ability to create dynamics. In Germany, the six sonatas op. 65 of Felix Mendelssohn (published 1845) marked the beginning of a renewed interest in composing for the organ. Inspired by the newly built Cavaillé-Coll organs, the French organist-composers César Franck, Alexandre Guilmant and Charles-Marie Widor led organ music into the symphonic realm. The development of symphonic organ music continued with Louis Vierne and Charles Tournemire. Widor and Vierne wrote large-scale, multi-movement works called organ symphonies that exploited the full possibilities of the symphonic organ, such as Widor's Symphony for Organ No. 6 and Vierne's Organ Symphony No. 3. Max Reger and Sigfrid Karg-Elert's symphonic works made use of the abilities of the large Romantic organs then built in Germany.

Carol Williams performs "Flight of the Bumblebee" by Nikolai Rimsky-Korsakov at the United States Military Academy West Point Cadet Chapel.

In the 19th and 20th centuries, organ builders began to build instruments in concert halls and other large secular venues, allowing the organ to be used as part of an orchestra, as in Saint-Saëns' Symphony No. 3 (sometimes known as the Organ Symphony). Frequently the organ is given a soloistic part, such as in Joseph Jongen's Symphonie Concertante for Organ & Orchestra, Francis Poulenc's Concerto for Organ, Strings and Tympani, and Frigyes Hidas' Organ Concerto.

=== Modern and contemporary ===
Other composers who have used the organ prominently in orchestral music include Gustav Holst, Richard Strauss, Ottorino Respighi, Gustav Mahler, Anton Bruckner, and Ralph Vaughan Williams. Because these concert hall instruments could approximate the sounds of symphony orchestras, transcriptions of orchestral works found a place in the organ repertoire. As silent films became popular, theatre organs were installed in theatres to provide accompaniment for the films.

In the 20th-century symphonic repertoire, both sacred and secular, continued to progress through the music of Marcel Dupré, Maurice Duruflé, and Herbert Howells. Other composers, such as Olivier Messiaen, György Ligeti, Jehan Alain, Jean Langlais, Gerd Zacher, and Petr Eben, wrote post-tonal organ music. Messiaen's music in particular redefined many of the traditional notions of organ registration and technique.

Albert Schweitzer was an organist who studied the music of German composer Johann Sebastian Bach and influenced the Organ reform movement.

Film composer Hans Zimmer prominently used the pipe organ in his score for the movie Interstellar. The final recording took place in London's Temple Church on a 1926 four-manual Harrison and Harrison organ.
