= Michał Szostak =

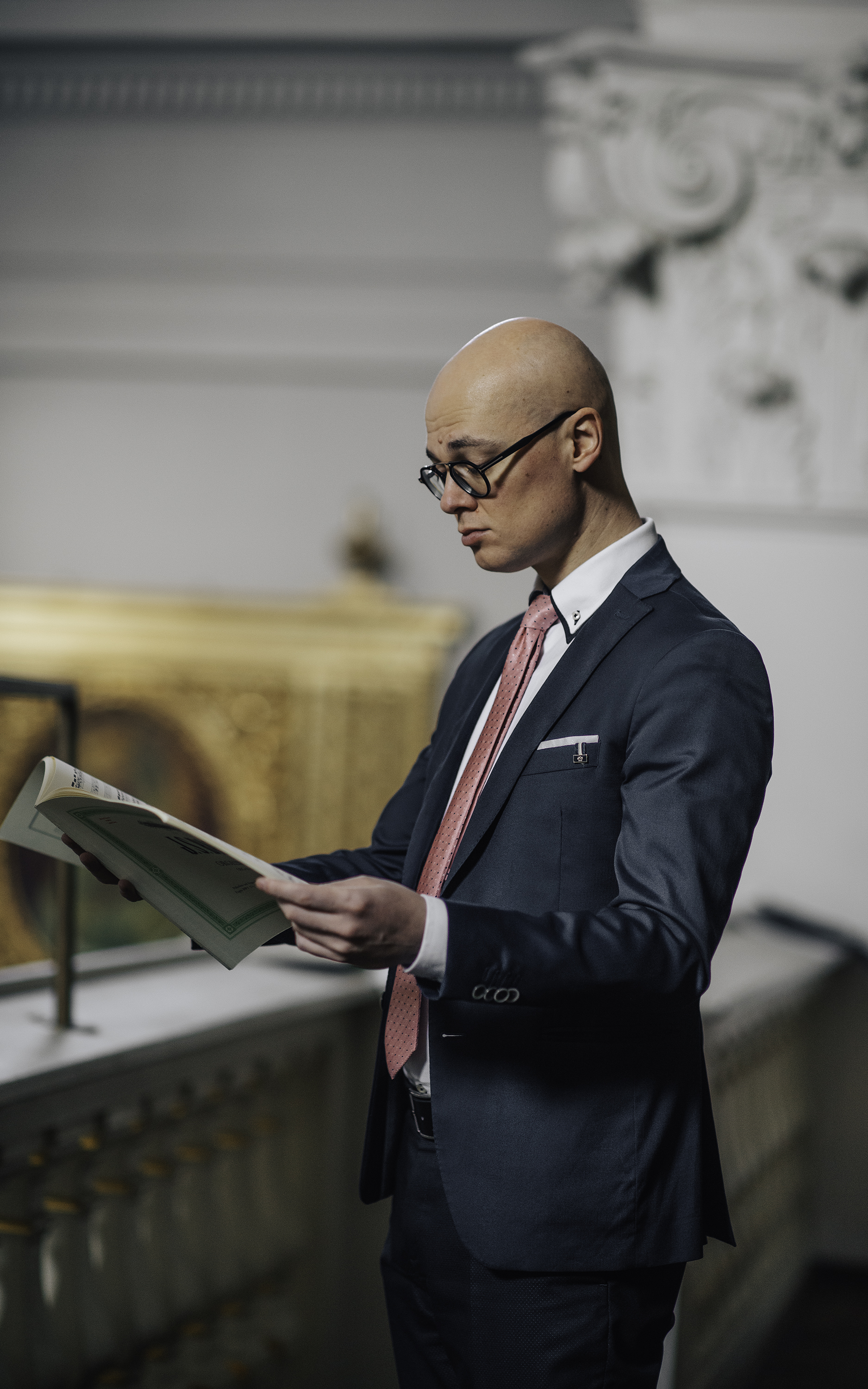
Michał Szostak (2019)

Michał Szostak (born 1980 in Poland) is an international concert organist, improviser, and musicologist, as well as business manager, university professor, and scientific researcher; he is a Habilitated Doctor (Associate Professor) in Management, and a Doctor of Musical Arts in Organ Performance.

He studied organ performance at Warsaw's Fryderyk Chopin Music University under Professor Andrzej Chorosiński, and organ improvisation at Milan's Pontificio Istituto Ambrosiano di Musica Sacra under Maestro Davide Paleari, as well as management and marketing (Master and PhD studies) at Warsaw's Leon Koźmiński Academy.

As the first Pole, he received the certificate of The Royal College of Organists. He is a member of The American Guild of Organists, The Organ Historical Society, and the Polish Chapter of the Humanistic Management Network.

== Musical career ==
He performs annually dozens organ recitals around the world in Africa, Americas, Asia, and Europe. The list of countries in which he performed includes Argentina, Austria, Brazil, Canada, Chile, Czech Republic, Denmark, Estonia, Finland, France, Germany, Italy, Kazakhstan, Latvia, Lithuania, Moldova, Nigeria, Panama, Poland, Slovakia, Spain, Ukraine, Vatican, the United Kingdom, and the USA.

He is an author of books, chapters of books, post-conference publications and scientific articles in international magazines, including American The Diapason and The Vox Humana, British The Organ, Canadian Organ Canada. He has the widest international bibliography among the Polish scholars working in area of organ studies. His fields of scientific explorations in the area of organ music are: instruments - their features and construction, historical tendencies in organ building, historical and contemporary organ performance practices, life and creation of important figures of organ music world. He is an author of original approaches in scientific fields of organology, e.g., methodology of the comparison of pipe organs according to their size, aesthetically oriented approach to the perception of organ music.

In the years 2011–2018, he held the prestigious position of Music Director and Principal Organist at the Shrine of the Virgin Mary in Licheń Stary, where he played on the largest organ in Poland (built by the Zych company, 157 stops, 6 manuals) located in the Basilica in Licheń Stary (the largest church in Poland). In the years 2002–2011, he was Music Director and Principal Organist at the Our Lady of Lourdes church in Warsaw. Since 2025, he serves as Principal Organist at the church of the Presentation of the Lord in Warsaw.

He recorded on CDs (on the largest organ in Poland in Lichen basilica: “Ave Regina Caelorum” with improvisations and French Inspirations: 2nd half of the 19th century with French repertoire and improvisations; Prague Impressions on the Petr organ in the church of St. Ignace in Prague, Czech Republic; British Organ Majesty 1 & 2, a two-CD set of reppertoire and improvisations recorded at Blackburn Cathedral, St Stephen's Walbrook in London, Centenary Methodist Church in Boston, City Hall in Hull, and Town Hall in Huddersfield) released by L'Arte dell'Organo label, for radio broadcasts, TV and online platforms. He is an often guest of public broadcasts. He was an co-author of organological auditions in Rado 106,2. Between 2004 and 2023, he had been the founder and president of the Jan Drzewoski Foundation, focused on a broad spectrum of organ-related issues.

== Managerial and academic career ==
He holds a position of Associate Professor, Vice-Rector for Scientific and International Affairs, and Head of the Institute for Management Research at Civitas University in Warsaw. His main research interests include the intersection of aesthetics, art, and management, management aesthetics, humanistic management, and art management. He publishes the research results in books, book chapters, and articles in international scientific journals and top publishing houses (Brill, Palgrave Macmillan, Routledge). Between 2021 and 2023, he held a position of Associate Professor and Deputy Dean for International Programs at the Management Faculty at the University of Social Sciences in Warsaw.

He holds also several positions at scientific journals: Art of Humanistic Management Journal (founder and Editor-in-Chief), Sport and Policy Journal (Deputy Editor-in-Chief), Discourses on Culture (Advisory Board Member), Journal of Intercultural Management (Scientific Board Member), and Journal of Security and Sustainability Issues (International Editorial Board Member).

He runs extensive didactic activities at Bachelor, Master and MBA programs in Poland and in the international environment, including the Polish campus of the American Clark University, PRIGO University in the Czech Republic, VSEMS in Slovakia, and University of Klaipeda in Lithuania. The subjects of teaching include the field of finance (international finance, corporate finance, financial analysis, financial accounting, management accounting) and the field of humanistic management, management aesthetics, art management and marketing.

Since the 2000s, he has been a business practitioner in top management positions in capital groups in an international environment – mainly in the commercial and industrial sectors – cooperating with corporations from the USA, Canada, EU countries and South Korea. He has practical experience in the field of financial and organisational optimisation of business processes and entire enterprises, preparation and handling of mergers, divisions, separation of organised parts of enterprises and acquisition activities of capital companies, partnerships, and private business activities, as well as the implementation and maintenance of quality management systems.
