= J. L. van den Heuvel Orgelbouw =

Dutch pipe organ builders

- Company type: Organ builder
- Industry: Pipe organ construction and restoration
- Founded: 1967
- Headquarters: Dordrecht, Netherlands
- Key people: Jan L. and Peter van den Heuvel
- Products: New and restored pipe organs
- Services: Maintenance and restoration of old organs; construction of new organs
- Website: http://vandenheuvel-orgelbouw.nl/English.htm

J. L. van den Heuvel Orgelbouw is a firm of pipe organ builders, based in Dordrecht, Netherlands. The company specialises in the construction of instruments in the French Symphonic tradition.

== History of the firm ==
Jan van den Heuvel had, from early childhood, felt an affinity with symphonic organ music. Jan founded his organ building company in 1967 at the age of twenty (this made him the youngest organ builder in the Netherlands), having spent four years in training with Flentrop in Zaandam, where he persisted in his championship of the romantic organ in the face of Dirk Andries Flentrop's neo-Baroque ideals.

Jan constructed his first organ (one manual and pedals, 10 stops) in 1967, attracting immediate critical acclaim for its voicing and high build standard. The actual construction took place in the workshop belonging to his father, a painter. He was commissioned to build a new three manual organ of 32 stops for the Singelkerk at Ridderkerk as a result of the many positive reactions to this first instrument - a significant milestone in the young organ-builder's career, as he was responsible not only for the design and construction of the instrument, but also for the richly carved organ case. The commissioning of this instrument necessitated the construction of a new workshop, which Jan himself designed. The instrument attracted widespread praise, leading to numerous orders for new organs and restoration of existing instruments. A new organ of two manuals and 33 stops was commissioned for the Lambertuskerk, Strijen, which was delivered in 1975, the year in which Jan's 17-year-old brother Peter joined the firm. Expansion of the business, with further enlargement of the workshops, was underpinned by receipt of a volume of new contracts for large organs. Particularly worthy of mention amongst these are the instruments in the Nieuwe Kerk, Katwijk aan Zee, l'Église Saint-Eustache, Paris (the largest organ in France), the Victoria Hall in Geneva and the Katarina kyrka in Stockholm (the last two buildings now restored after being gutted by fire) and the DR-BYEN Hall in Copenhagen.

== Tonal ethos ==
Both Jan and Peter van den Heuvel were for a number of years interested in nineteenth century French organ building, as well as the traditions previously practiced in the Netherlands. Their contact with French organists such as Michelle Leclerc and Daniel Roth spurred them on to further studies on the Aristide Cavaillé-Coll organs. This led to numerous visits to France, not only to study and evaluate famous Cavaille-Coll organs (such as St. Sulpice, Notre-Dame and Sacré-Cœur in Paris). The brothers developed Cavaillé-Coll's own schemes to establish a style of organ that was entirely their own, but completely inspired by the French Symphonic tradition. This ethos continues to this day. However, not only does the firm specialise in French-style instruments, but they have also built organs in traditional Dutch style.

== Notable organs ==
Date	Country	Place	Building	Size	Comments
1970	NL	Ridderkerk	Singelkerk	IIIP/32	J. L. van den Heuvel's first major commission
1979	NL	Katwijk aan Zee	Nieuwe Kerk	IVP/80	One of the Netherlands' largest organs
1989	FR	Paris	Église Saint-Eustache	VP/101	The largest organ in France
1992	CH	Geneva	Victoria Hall	IVP/71	The only van den Heuvel organ in Switzerland
1993	GB	Glasgow	St Aloysius Church, Glasgow	IIP/24	The only van den Heuvel organ in Britain - formerly at Royal Academy of Music, Dukes' Hall, London
1994	USA	New York City	Church of the Holy Apostles	IIIP/32	The first vdH organ in the USA. Originally in Castle Shiloah, TX.
1995	SE	Stockholm	Kungliga Musikhögskolan	IIIP/25	The first van den Heuvel organ in Sweden.
1995	NL	Rotterdam	Maranatha Kerk	IIIP/25	The Musikhögskolan's twin, built for another buyer who pulled out
1997	DE	Berlin	St Franziskus Kirche	IIIP/51	The only van den Heuvel organ in Germany
2000	SE	Stockholm	Katarina Kyrka	IIIP/62	Replaced a 1976 Åkerman & Lund organ destroyed by fire in 1990
2000	NL	The Hague	Residence of Ben van Oosten	IIIP/16	vdH's first commission for a house-organ from a famous organist
2000	FI	Mänttä	Church	IIIP/30	The only vdH organ in Finland: also, their only totally enclosed organ
2006	DK	Copenhagen	Copenhagen Concert Hall	IVP/91	The only van den Heuvel organ in Denmark. Inaugurated in 2009.

== Notable players of van den Heuvel organs ==
- Thomas Ospital
- Ben van Oosten
- Jean Guillou
- Torvald Torén
- Dirk Donker
- David Lumsden

== Photo gallery ==
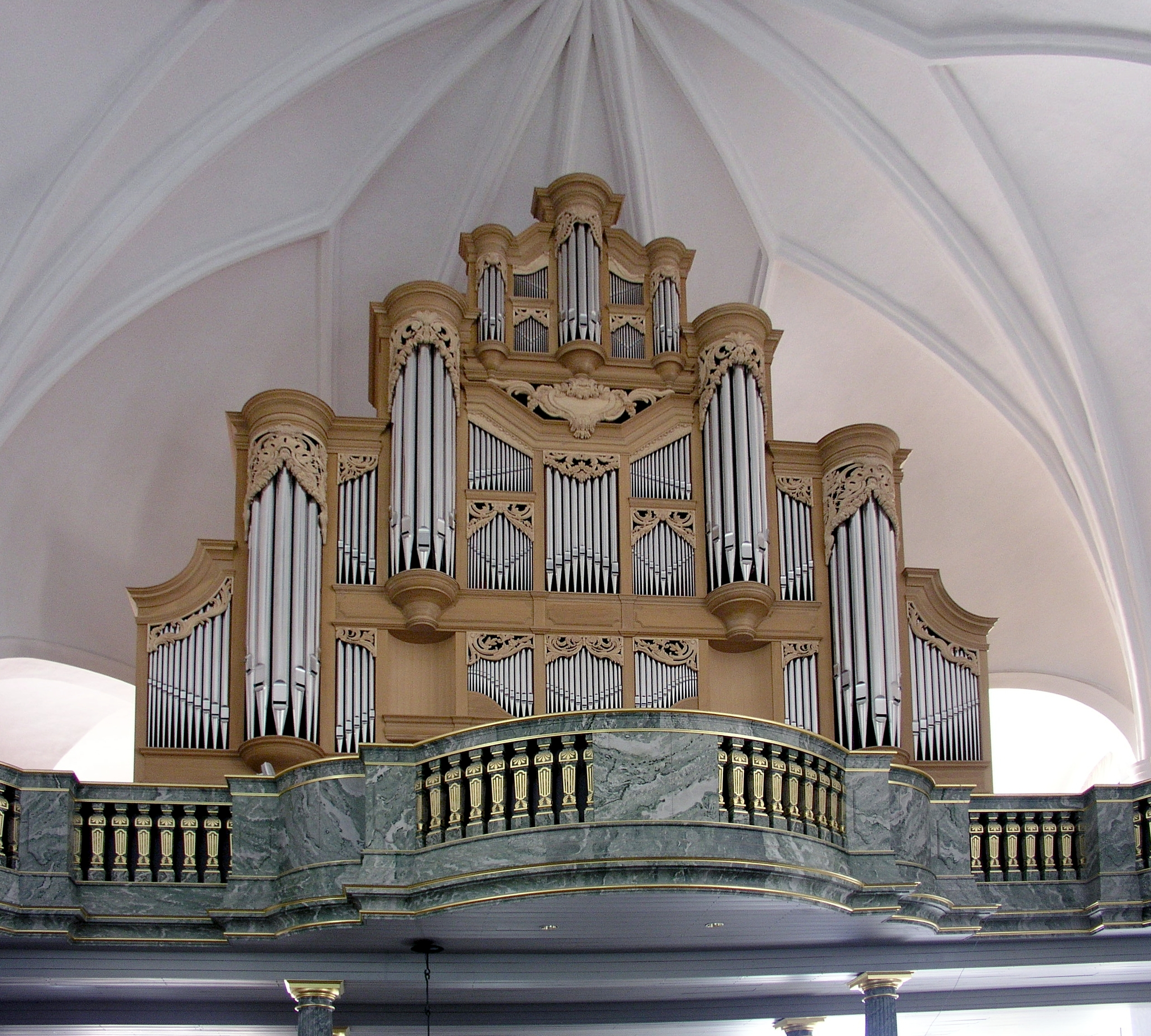
The organ of the Katarina kyrka, Stockholm

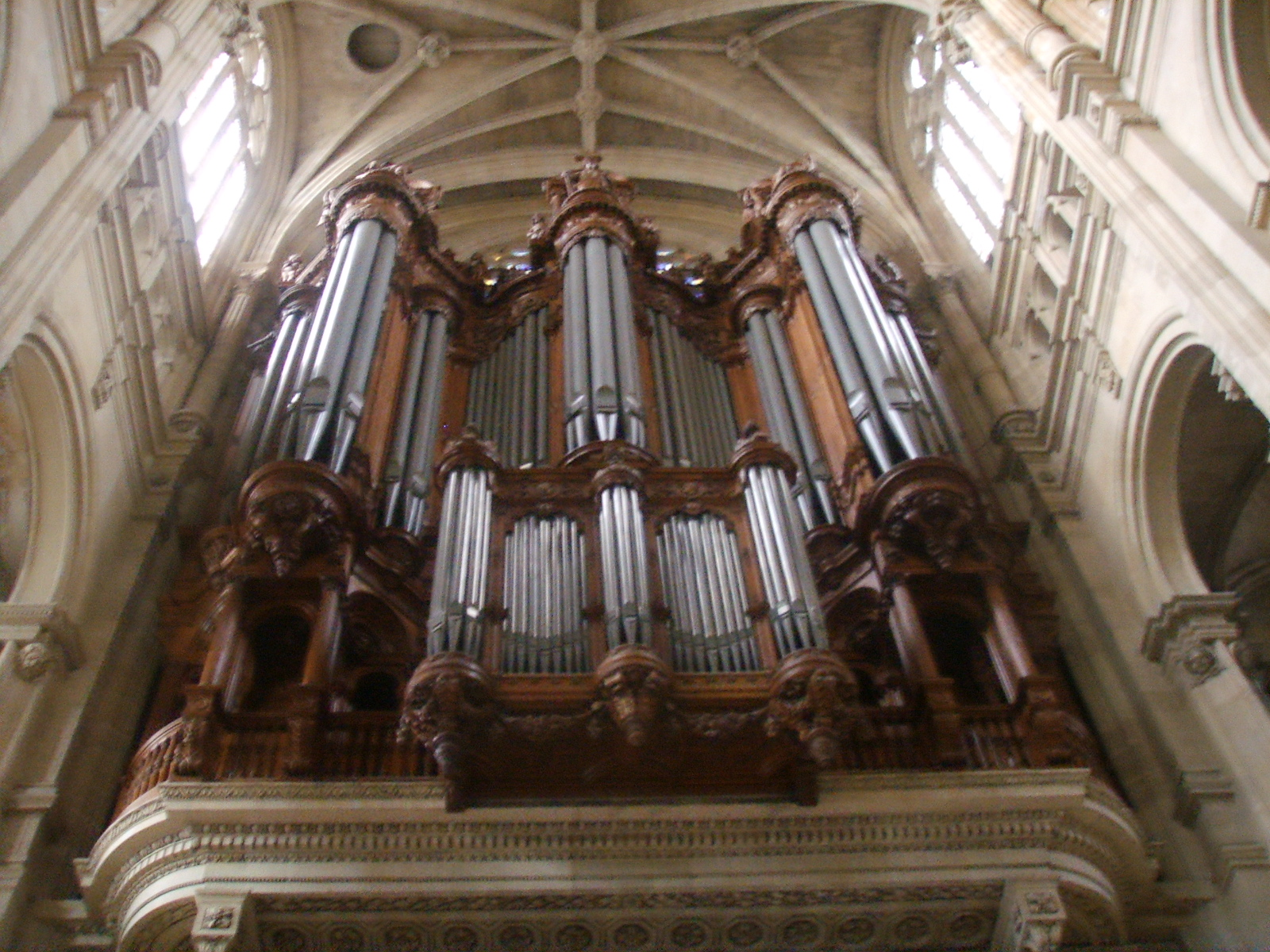
The organ of the Église Saint-Eustache, Paris.

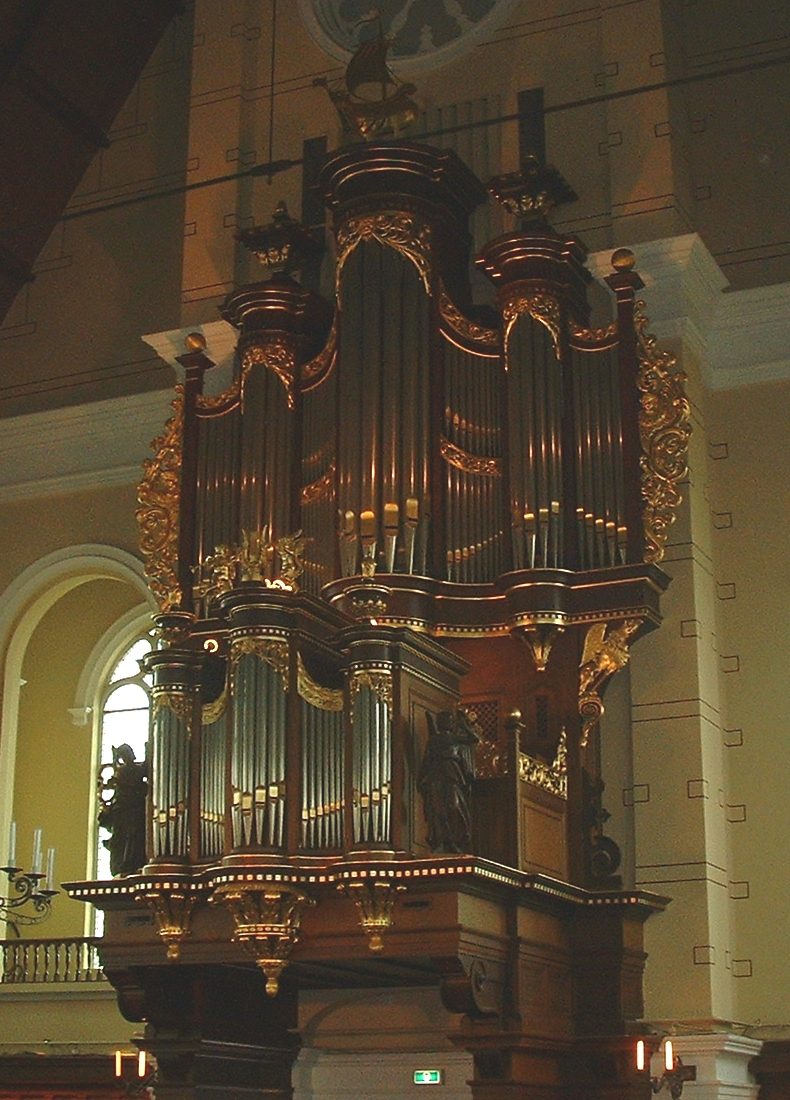
The organ of the Nieuwe Kerk, Katwijk aan Zee.
