= Ben van Oosten =

Dutch organist, pedagogue and author

- Born: Bernardus Franciscus van Oosten; 1955 (age 70–71); The Hague, Netherlands
- Genres: Classical
- Occupations: Organist, pedagogue, author
- Instrument: Pipe organ

Bernardus Franciscus van Oosten (born 8 April 1955) is a Dutch organist, pedagogue and author. He is titular organist of the Grote Kerk in his hometown of The Hague and is an organ professor at Rotterdam Conservatoire.

== Biography ==
Ben van Oosten, as he is professionally known, was born in The Hague in 1955. He gave his first organ recital in 1970 at the age of 15. He was accepted at the prestigious Sweelinck Conservatory in Amsterdam and studied the organ with Albert de Klerk and piano with Berthe Davelaar. He graduated cum laude in 1979 with a diploma in organ solo.

He completed advanced studies in Paris, France, with André Isoir and Daniel Roth. Whether by geographical influence or artistic choice, he gravitated toward the French Romantic Organ school of the 19th century that had its origins in the new symphonic organs of Aristide Cavaillé-Coll. Van Oosten subsequently became one of the greatest practitioners and interpreters of organ works from that era. Among his recordings are the complete works of Charles-Marie Widor, of Louis Vierne, and of Marcel Dupré, as well as the eight sonatas of Alexandre Guilmant and organ works of Jacques-Nicolas Lemmens and Louis James Alfred Lefébure-Wély.

Besides maintaining a heavy recital schedule and an active private teaching practice, he serves as organist for the Grote Kerk (The Hague) and is a professor of music at the Rotterdam Conservatory.

Among the honors and awards he has received are the Preis der deutschen Schallplattenkritik and the Diapason d'Or. In 1998, the French government awarded him the honorary rank of Chevalier dans l'Ordre des Arts et des Lettres for his efforts in reviving the French Romantic tradition.

van Oosten is also known for possessing a 16-stop 3-manual residence organ by the Dutch organbuilders Van den Heuvel.

== Discography ==
- Marcel Dupré: Complete Works for Organ (vol. 1–12), 2000-2010
- Alexandre Guilmant: Complete Organ Sonatas, 2007
- Louis James Alfred Lefébure-Wély: Organ Works, 2005
- Jacques-Nicolas Lemmens: Organ Works, 2000
- Camille Saint-Saëns: Complete Organ Works, 2012
- Louis Vierne: Complete Organ Symphonies, 1997
- Louis Vierne: 24 Pièces de Fantaisie, 1999
- Louis Vierne: 24 Pièces en style libre and other works, 2001
- Charles-Marie Widor: Complete Works for Organ (vol. 1–7), 1993-1998
- Les Angélus: French Sacred Music for Soprano and Organ (with Margaret Roest), 2000
- Festival of French Organ Music (with music from Bonnet, Gigout, Dubois and Boëllmann), 2011
- Festival of English Organ Music (with music from Hollins, Stanford, Whitlock and Elgar), Vol. 1, 2014
- Festival of English Organ Music (with music from Elgar, Hollins, Parry, Smart, Ireland, Vol. 2, 2015

== Bibliography ==
- Vater der Orgelsymphonie, biography of Widor, ISBN 3-928243-04-7
