= John T. Fesperman =

American conductor, organist and author

John T. Fesperman (January 12, 1925 Charlotte, NC, US – June 2, 2001 Mitchellville, MD, US) was an American conductor, organist and author of several books on organs. From 1965 to 1995 he worked at the Division of Musical Instruments at the National Museum of History and Technology, part of the Smithsonian Institution.

== Career ==
Fesperman attended the University of North Carolina, cutting short his studies to serve in the U.S. Navy (1943–1946) during World War II. He earned a B.S. degree from Davidson College (1948) and a B.Mus. degree at the Yale University School of Music (1951). He also studied at the Salzburg Mozarteum in 1951. In 1955 he was awarded a Fulbright scholarship to continue his studies in Amsterdam, where he met the Dutch organ-builder Dirk Andries Flentrop. Later he was to write a book on Flentrop's influence in the United States. He and Flentrop co-authored a paper on The Organs of Mexico City Cathedral, published by the Smithsonian in 1986.

Fesperman began teaching music at Alabama College in Montevallo, Alabama, and directed the choir at Montevallo's St. Andrews Episcopal Church in 1958 as well. He then moved to Boston, where he taught organ at the New England Conservatory and was active both concertizing and recording several organ and vocal works, including Masses.

In 1965, he moved to the National Museum of History and Technology (Smithsonian), staying with that institution in various capacities for the next thirty years. While there, he participated in organ-restoration projects and in the planning and design of new organs for various buildings. For example, he helped restore the 1855 Stevens and Jewett organ in the Armed Forces Retirement Home Protestant Chapel in Washington, DC. He also consulted in the building and installation of the new Pohick Episcopal Church organ in Lorton, Virginia. He retired from the Smithsonian in 1995, and died at 76 on June 2, 2001.

== Philosophy ==
Although Fesperman preferred traditional classical organ design, he didn't always agree with traditional practices. He felt that organs should be installed in the center of the long axis of the building or room housing them, and that "among the worst possible solutions is to divide the organ in chambers on either side of the choir of the church" – although this was common practice before the 1950s. In his 1970 book A Snetzler chamber organ of 1761, he took a positive view of "residence organs" installed in private residences, which were popular in the 18th century and revived in the United States in the mid-1950s. He supported mechanical stop-action, praising it for simplicity of engineering and advantages it gave the player.

== Bibliography ==
- John T. Fesperman (1962). The organ as musical medium. Coleman-Ross Co.
- John T. Fesperman (1970). "A Snetzler chamber organ of 1761". Smithsonian Studies in History and Technology (8). Smithsonian Institution Press.
- John T. Fesperman (1975). Two essays on organ design. Sunbury Press. ISBN 0-915548-01-1.
- John T. Fesperman; Scott Odell (1980). Organs in Mexico. Sunbury Press. ISBN 0-915548-07-0.
- Arend Jan Gierveld; John T. Fesperman (1981). Antieke nederlandse huisorgels uit het bezit van Dirk Andries Flentrop.
- Arend Jan Gierveld; John T. Fesperman (1981). The Flentrop collection of Dutch chamber organs. Sunbury Press. ISBN 0-915548-13-5.
- Episcopal Church; John T. Fesperman; Joyce Glover; Raymond F. Glover; Marion J. Hatchett; Marilyn J. Keiser; Dennis Schmidt (1981). Hymnal Studies. Church Hymnal Corp.
- John T. Fesperman (1982). Flentrop in America: an account of the work and influence of the Dutch organ builder D.A. Flentrop in the United States, 1939–1977. Sunbury Press. ISBN 0-915548-14-3.
- John T. Fesperman (1984). Organ planning: asking the right questions. Church Publishing, Inc. ISBN 0-89869-109-5.
