= Organ console =

Control area of a pipe organ

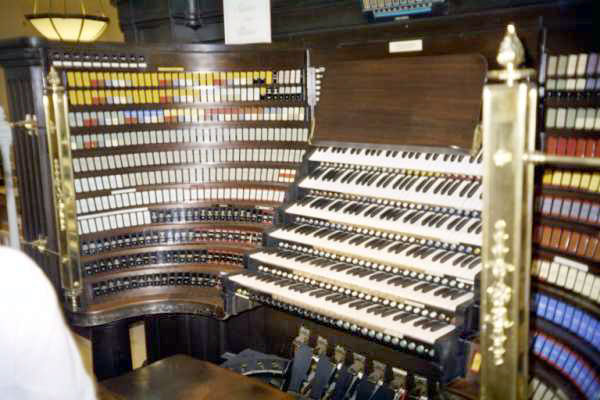
The console of the Wanamaker Organ in the Macy's (formerly Wanamaker's) department store in Philadelphia, featuring six manuals and colour-coded stop tabs.

The pipe organ is played from an area called the console or keydesk, which holds the manuals (keyboards), pedals, stop controls and pistons. Pistons are used to select a registration with stops. In electric-action organs, the console is often movable. This allows for greater flexibility in placement of the console for various activities. Some very large organs, such as the van den Heuvel organ at the Church of St. Eustache in Paris, have more than one console, enabling the organ to be played from several locations depending on the nature of the performance.

Controls at the console called stops select which ranks of pipes are used. These controls are generally either draw knobs (or stop knobs), which engage the stops when pulled out from the console; stop tablets (or tilting tablets) which are hinged at their far end; or rocker-tablets, which rock up and down on a central axle.

Different combinations of stops change the timbre of the instrument considerably. The selection of stops is called the registration. On modern organs, the registration can be changed instantaneously with the aid of a combination action, usually featuring pistons. Pistons are buttons that can be pressed by the organist to change registrations; they are generally found between the manuals or above the pedalboard. In the latter case they are called toe studs or toe pistons (as opposed to thumb pistons). Most large organs have both preset and programmable pistons, with some of the couplers repeated for convenience as pistons and toe studs. Programmable pistons allow comprehensive and rapid control over changes in registration.

Newer organs in the 2000s may have multiple levels of solid-state memory, allowing each piston to be programmed more than once. This allows more than one organist to store their own registrations. Many newer consoles also feature MIDI, which allows the organist to record performances. It also allows an external keyboard to be plugged in, which assists in tuning and maintenance.

== Organization of console controls ==
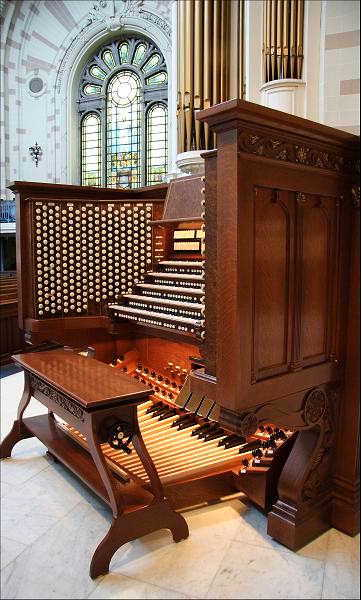
The United States Naval Academy chapel's new five-manual console, crafted by R. A. Colby, Inc. of Johnson City, TN. It boasts 522 draw knobs, and, together with the other controls available to the organist, has 796 total controls.

The layout of an organ console is not standardized, but most organs follow historic conventions for the country and style of organ, so that the layout of stops and pistons is broadly predictable. The stops controlling each division (see Keyboards) are grouped together. Within these, the standard arrangement is for the lowest sounding stops (32 ft or 16 ft) to be placed at the bottom of the columns, with the higher pitched stops placed above this, (8 ft 4 ft, 2 2/3 ft, 2 ft, etc.); the mixtures are placed above this (II, III, V, etc.). The stops controlling the reed ranks are placed collectively above these in the same order as above, often with the stop engraving in red. In a horizontal row of stop tabs, a similar arrangement would be applied left to right rather than bottom to top. Among stops of the same pitch, louder stops are generally placed below softer ones (so an Open Diapason would be placed towards the bottom and a Dulciana towards the top), but this is less predictable since it depends on the exact stops available and the space available to arrange stop knobs.

Thus, an example stop configuration for a Great division may look like this:

4 ft Clarion	
16 ft Trombone	8 ft Trumpet
2 ft Fifteenth	V Mixture
4 ft Principal	2 2/3 ft Twelfth
8 ft Dulciana	4 ft Harmonic Flute
8 ft Open Diapason	8 ft Stopped Diapason
16 ft Double Open Diapason	
Gt Super Octave	Gt Sub Octave
Swell to Great	Choir to Great

The standard position for these columns of stops (assuming drawknobs are used) is for the Choir or Positive division to be on the outside of the player's right, with the Great nearer the center of the console and the music rest. On the left hand side, the Pedal division is on the outside, with the Swell to the inside. Other divisions can be placed on either side, depending on the amount of space available. Manual couplers and octave extensions are placed either within the stop knobs of the divisions that they control, or grouped together above the uppermost manual. The pistons, if present, are placed directly under the manual they control.

Contemporary disposition (2024) of stops and pedals at the console of the Great organ of Saint-Sulpice - Paris, 6th arrondissement, France. Interactive diagram derived from an old handwritten console plan by Aristide Cavaillé-Coll.

To be more historically accurate, organs built along historical models will often use older schemes for organizing the keydesk controls.

== Keyboards ==
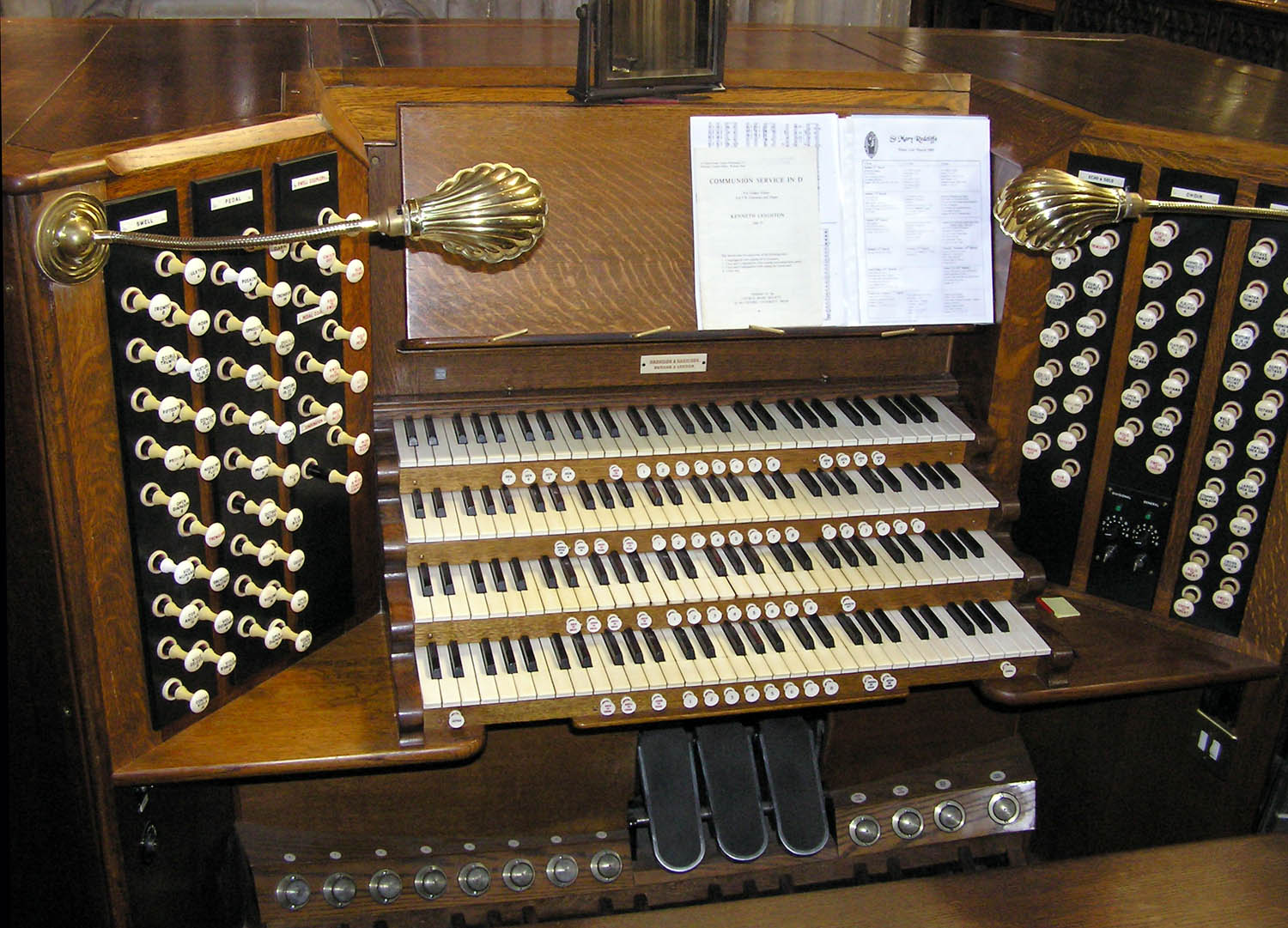
The four-manual organ console at St. Mary's Redcliffe church, Bristol, England. The organ was built by Harrison and Harrison in 1912 and restored in 1990. The manuals, from the bottom to top are: Choir, Great, Swell, and Solo/Echo.

The organ is played with at least one keyboard, with configurations featuring from two to five keyboards being the most common. A keyboard to be played by the hands is called a manual (from the Latin manus, "hand"); an organ with four keyboards is said to have four manuals. Most organs also have a pedalboard, a large keyboard to be played by the feet. [Note that the keyboards are never actually referred to as "keyboards", but as "manuals" and "pedalboard", as the case may be.]

The collection of ranks controlled by a particular manual is called a division. The names of the divisions of the organ vary geographically and stylistically. Common names for divisions are:

- Great, Swell, Choir, Solo, Orchestral, Echo, Antiphonal (English-speaking countries)
- Hauptwerk, Schwellwerk, Rückpositiv, Oberwerk, Brustwerk (Germany)
- Grand-Chœur, Grand-Orgue, Récit, Positif, Bombarde, Solo (France)
- Hoofdwerk, Rugwerk, Bovenwerk, Borstwerk, Zwelwerk, Groot, Positief (the Netherlands)

Like the arrangement of stops, the keyboard divisions are also arranged in a common order. Taking the English names as an example, the main manual (the bottom manual on two-manual instruments or the middle manual on three-manual instruments) is traditionally called the Great, and the upper manual is called the Swell. If there is a third manual, it is usually the Choir and is placed below the Great. (The name "Choir" is a corruption of "Chair", as this division initially came from the practice of placing a smaller, self-contained, organ at the rear of the organist's bench. This is also why it is called a Positif which means portable organ.) If it is included, the Solo manual is usually placed above the Swell. Some larger organs contain an Echo or Antiphonal division, usually controlled by a manual placed above the Solo. German and American organs generally use the same configuration of manuals as English organs. On French instruments, the main manual (the Grand Orgue) is at the bottom, with the Positif and the Récit above it. If there are more manuals, the Bombarde is usually above the Récit and the Grand Choeur is below the Grand Orgue or above the Bombarde.

In addition to names, the manuals may be numbered with Roman numerals, starting from the bottom. Organists will frequently mark a part in their music with the number of the manual they intend to play it on, and this is sometimes seen in the original composition, typically in pieces written when organs were smaller and only had two or three manuals. It is also common to see couplers labeled as "II to I" (see Couplers below).

In some cases, an organ contains more divisions than it does manuals. In these cases, the extra divisions are called floating divisions and are played by coupling them to another manual. Usually this is the case with Echo/Antiphonal and Orchestral divisions, and sometimes it is seen with Solo and Bombarde divisions.

Although manuals are almost always horizontal, organs with three or more manuals may incline the uppermost manuals towards the organist to make them easier to reach.

Many new chamber organs and harpsichords today feature transposing keyboards, which can slide up or down one or more semitones. This allows these instruments to be played with Baroque instruments at a ft=415 Hz, modern instruments at a ft=440 Hz, or Renaissance instruments at a ft=466 Hz. Modern organs are typically tuned in equal temperament, in which every semitone is 100 cents wide. Many organs that are built today following historical models are still tuned to historically appropriate temperaments.

The range (compass) of the keyboards on an organ has varied widely between different time periods and different nationalities. Portative organs may have a range of only an octave or two, while a few large organs, such as the Boardwalk Hall Auditorium Organ, may have some manual keyboards approaching the size of a modern piano, with the range far exceeding it at 11 octaves. German organs of the seventeenth and eighteenth centuries featured manual ranges from C to f′′′ and pedal ranges from C to d′, though some organs only had manual ranges that extended down to F. Many French organs of this period had pedal ranges that went down to AA (though this ravalement applied only to the reeds, and may have only included the low AA, not AA-sharp or BB). French organs of the nineteenth century typically had manual ranges from C to g′′′ and pedal ranges from C to f′; in the twentieth century the manual range was extended to a′′′. The modern console specification recommended by the American Guild of Organists calls for manual keyboards with sixty-one notes (five octaves, from C to c′′′′) and pedal keyboards with thirty-two notes (two and a half octaves, from C to g′). These ranges apply to the notes written on the page; depending on the registration, the actual range of the instrument may be much greater.

== Enclosure and expression pedals ==
On most organs, at least one division will be enclosed. On a two-manual (Great and Swell) organ, this will be the Swell division (from where the name comes); on larger organs often part, or all of, the Choir and Solo divisions will be enclosed as well.

Enclosure is the term for the device that allows volume control (crescendo and diminuendo) for a manual without the addition or subtraction of stops. All the pipes for the division are surrounded by a box-like structure (often simply called the swell box). One side of the box, usually that facing the console or the listener, will be constructed from vertical or horizontal palettes (wooden flaps) which can be opened or closed from the console. This works in a similar fashion to a Venetian blind. When the box is 'open' it allows more sound to be heard than if it were 'closed'.

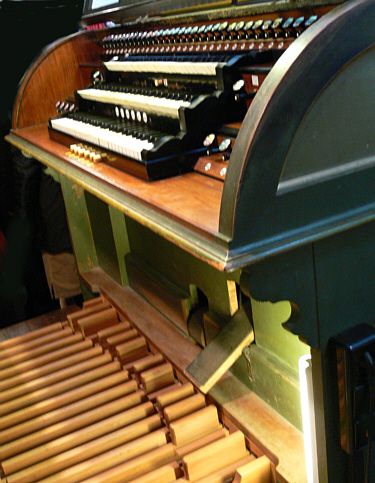
Image of a console and pedalboard, clearly showing the balanced swell pedal

The most common form of controlling the level of sound released from the enclosed box is by the use of a balanced expression pedal. This is usually placed above the centre of the pedalboard, rotating away from the organist from a near vertical position ("shut") to a near horizontal position ("open"). Unlike a car accelerator pedal, a balanced expression pedal remains in whatever position it was last moved to.

Historically, the enclosure was operated by the use of the ratchet swell lever, a spring-loaded lever that locks into two or three positions controlling the opening of the shutters. Many ratchet swell devices were replaced by the more advanced balanced pedal because it allows the enclosure to be left at any point, without having to keep a foot on the lever.

In addition, an organ may have a crescendo pedal, which would be found to the right of any expression pedals, and similarly balanced. Applying the crescendo pedal will incrementally activate the majority of the stops in the organ, starting with the softest stops and ending with the loudest, excluding only a handful of specialized stops that serve no purpose in a full ensemble. The order in which the stops are activated is usually preset by the organ builder and the crescendo pedal serves as a quick way for the organist to get to a registration that will sound attractive at a given volume without choosing a particular registration, or simply to get to full organ.

Most organs also have a piston and/or toe-stud labeled "Tutti" or "Sforzando" that activates full organ.

== Couplers ==
A device called a coupler allows the pipes of one division to be played simultaneously from an alternative manual. For example, a coupler labelled "Swell to Great" allows the stops of the Swell division to be played by the Great manual. It is unnecessary to couple the pipes of a division to the manual of the same name (for example, coupling the Great division to the Great manual), because those stops play by default on that manual (though this is done with super- and sub-couplers, see below). By using the couplers, the entire resources of an organ can be played simultaneously from one manual. On a mechanical-action organ, a coupler may connect one division's manual directly to the other, actually moving the keys of the first manual when the second is played.

Some organs feature a device to add the octave above or below what is being played by the fingers. The "super-octave" adds the octave above, the "sub-octave" the octave below. These may be attached to one division only, for example "Swell octave" (the super is often assumed), or they may act as a coupler, for example "Swell octave to Great" which gives the effect while playing on the Great division of adding the Swell division an octave above what is being played. These can be used in conjunction with the standard eight foot coupler. The super-octave may be labelled, for example, Swell to Great 4 ft; in the same manner, the sub-octave may be labelled Choir to Great 16 ft.

The inclusion of these couplers allows for greater registrational flexibility and color. Some literature (particularly romantic literature from France) calls explicitly for octaves aigües (super-couplers) to add brightness, or octaves graves (sub-couplers) to add gravity. Some organs feature extended ranks to accommodate the top and bottom octaves when the super- and sub-couplers are engaged (see the discussion under "Unification and extension").

In a similar vein are unison off couplers, which act to "turn off" the stops of a division on its own keyboard. For example, a coupler labelled "Great unison off" would keep the stops of the Great division from sounding, even if they were pulled. Unison off couplers can be used in combination with super- and sub-couplers to create complex registrations that would otherwise not be possible. In addition, the unison off couplers can be used with other couplers to change the order of the manuals at the console: engaging the Great to Choir and Choir to Great couplers along with the Great unison off and Choir unison off couplers would have the effect of moving the Great to the bottom manual and the Choir to the middle manual.

=== Divided pedal ===
Another form of coupler found on some large organs is the divided pedal. This is a device that allows the sounds played on the pedals to be split, so the lower octave (principally that of the left foot) plays stops from the pedal division while the upper half (played by the right foot), plays stops from one of the manual divisions. The choice of manual is at the discretion of the performer, as is the 'split point' of the system.

The system can be found on the organs of Gloucester Cathedral, having been added by Nicholson & Co (Worcester) Ltd/David Briggs and Truro Cathedral, having been added by Mander Organs/David Briggs, as well as on the new nave console of Ripon Cathedral. The system as found in Truro Cathedral operates like this:

- Divided Pedal (adjustable dividing point): A# B c c# d d#

under the 'divide': Pedal stops and couplers
above the 'divide': four illuminated controls: Choir/Swell/Great/Solo to Pedal

This allows four different sounds to be played at once (without thumbing down across manuals), for example:

Right hand: Great principals 8 ft and 4 ft
Left hand: Swell strings
Left foot: Pedal 16 ft and 8 ft flutes and Swell to Pedal coupler
Right foot: Solo Clarinet via divided pedal coupler
