= Crescendo pedal =

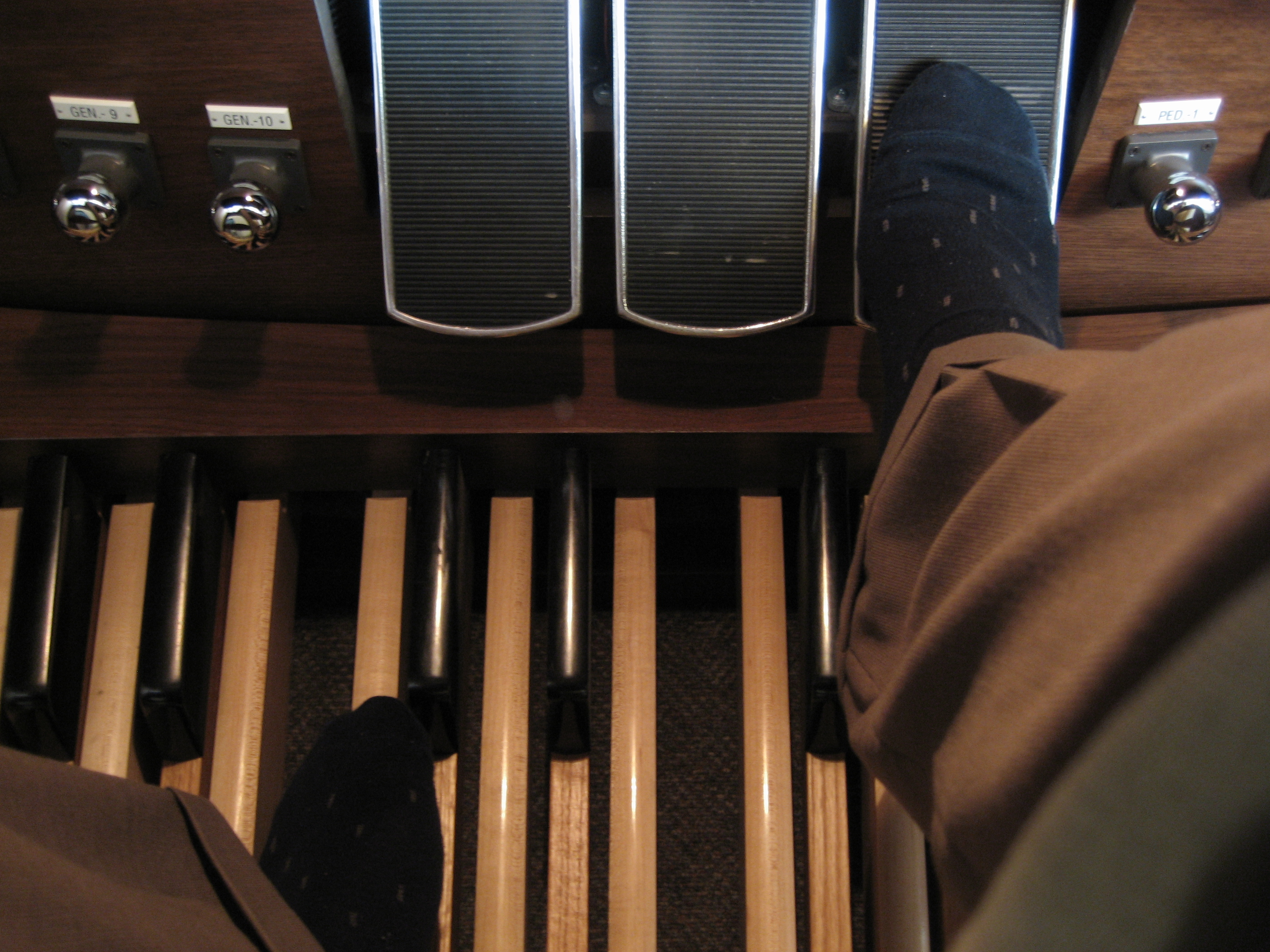
Crescendo pedal of an Allen Protege AP-31 digital organ, indicated by the organist's right foot.

A crescendo pedal is a large pedal commonly found on medium-sized and larger pipe organs (as well as digital organs), either partially or fully recessed within the organ console. The crescendo pedal incrementally activates stops as it is pressed forward and removes stops as it is depressed backward. The addition of stops, in order from quietest to loudest, creates the effect of a crescendo (and, likewise, a diminuendo, when the stops are deactivated). In actual use, the operation of the crescendo pedal usually does not move the draw knobs or stop tabs on the console; the stops are electronically activated inside the organ. Often an indicator light or lights will be present on the console to inform the organist of when the crescendo pedal is activated and how far it is engaged. The crescendo pedal is located directly above the pedalboard, to the right of any expression pedals that may be present.

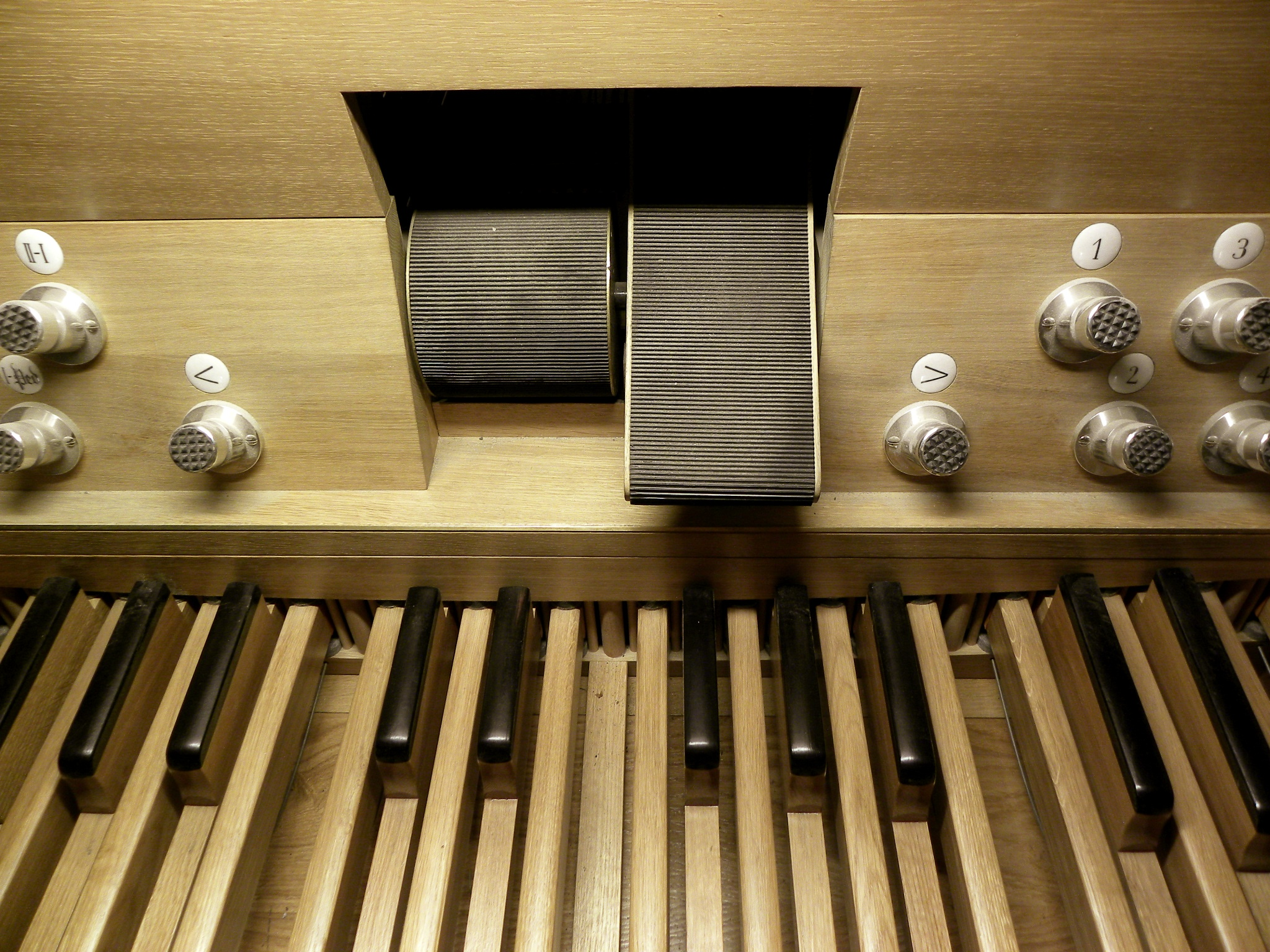
Rollschweller (left) and swell pedal (right)

The earliest type of automatic crescendo device was the Rollschweller (German for "roll-sweller") or Walze (German for "roller"), seen in large Romantic music era organs of the nineteenth century, almost exclusively in Germany. It consists of a wheel and axle, which would be horizontally mounted directly above the pedalboard. When turned toward the organist, the wheel would activate a mechanism that would add stops to the registration. Likewise, turning the wheel back would remove stops. The Rollschweller is constructed so that it may be turned forward or backward indefinitely. This gives the device a much longer field of operation than the modern crescendo pedal, thus making the dynamic change more smooth and gradual. It is especially helpful and appropriate in the playing of the organ works of Max Reger, Franz Liszt, and Sigfrid Karg-Elert, who all wrote for organs that featured a Rollschweller.

As the use of electricity became widespread in the early twentieth century, organ builders began to apply it to their instruments, electrifying the key action and the stop action as well as the expression pedals. An electrically operated crescendo pedal resembling an expression pedal was invented and mounted to the right of the expression pedals. The order in which the stops were activated by the crescendo pedal was set by the organ builder and could not be modified by the organist. This was the case until the later part of the twentieth century, when computerized devices were incorporated into console design, allowing greater customization of registration through more sophisticated combination actions. As a result, in organs with these devices, the stops controlled by the crescendo pedal are usually customizable, as is the order in which they are activated.

Reed organs and harmoniums of the late 19th and early 20th centuries often had a similar mechanism to a crescendo pedal. Since the player's feet were needed to pedal the bellows that provided the wind for the instrument, the mechanism was operated by a 'paddle' lever moved by one of the player's knees (the paddle being located under the keyboard). Usually this was called a 'full organ pedal', as it did not gradually engage ranks of stops in the manner of a true crescendo pedal, but simply engaged all the stops (and usually any octave couplers fitted to the instrument) when operated, with no progressive action.

== Use of the crescendo pedal ==
The crescendo pedal is typically used only in certain repertoire, and, generally speaking, the organ's expression pedal(s) are more commonly used. Because the crescendo pedal both resembles and is adjacent to the expression pedal(s), it may confuse beginning organists, such as pianists who are filling in at the church organ, who intend to use the expression pedal(s) rather than the crescendo pedal. To avoid this danger, the organist should look at the pedals before playing to ascertain if they are labeled, as well as practice locating the correct pedal by feel. When feeling for a pedal while playing, the organist should remember that the crescendo pedal is normally the right-most of the volume pedals, and that its surface is often raised slightly above the expression pedal(s) so as to help the organist to avoid selecting it by mistake.
