= Manual (music) =

Musical keyboard played with the hands

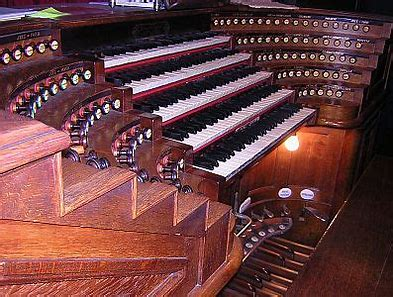
The console of the Great Organ at the Church of St Sulpice built by Aristide Cavaillé-Coll in 1862.

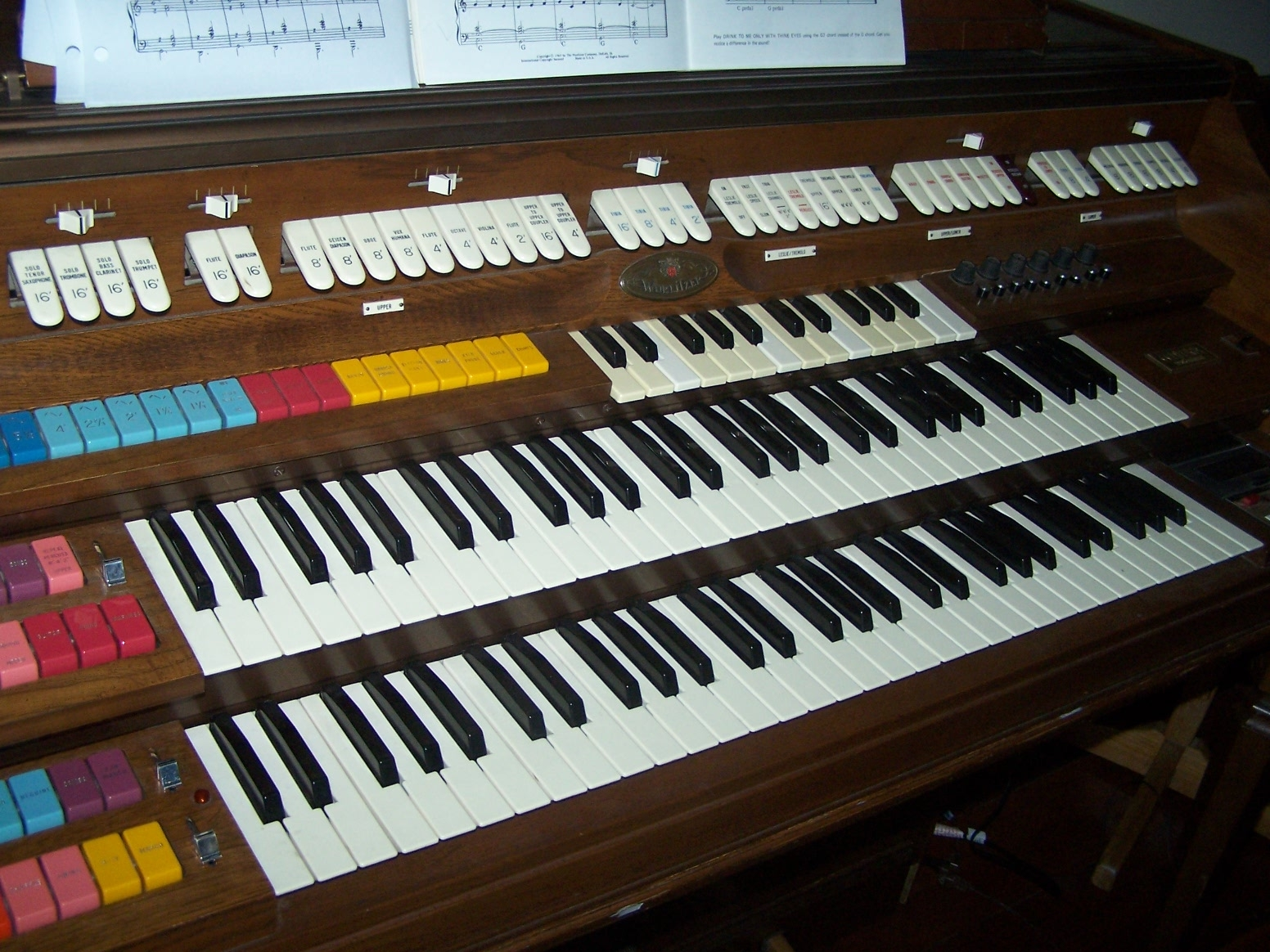
An electronic organ with three manuals. The two lower manuals are each five octaves in range, while the uppermost manual spans two octaves.

An electronic Wurlitzer organ with two manuals, offset from one another, to encourage playing different manuals.

A manual (pl. manuals) is any hand-operated keyboard on a keyboard instrument that either has a pedalboard (a keyboard on which notes are played with the feet, such as an organ) or has more than one hand-operated keyboard (such as a two- or three-manual harpsichord). (On instruments that have neither a pedalboard nor more than one hand-operated keyboard, the word "manual" is not a synonym for "keyboard".)

Music written to be played only on the manuals (and not using the pedals) can be designated by the word manualiter (first attested in 1511, but particularly common in the 17th and 18th centuries).

== Overview ==
A rare 2 manual piano, where the upper manual plays an octave higher than the lower.

Organs and synthesizers can, and usually do, have more than one manual; most home instruments have two manuals, while most larger organs have two or three, and the largest have up to 7. Elaborate pipe organs and theater organs can have four or more manuals. The manuals are set into the organ console (or "keydesk").

The layout of a manual is roughly the same as a piano keyboard, with long, usually ivory or light-colored keys for the natural notes of the Western musical scale, and shorter, usually ebony or dark-colored keys for the five sharps and flats. A typical, full-size organ manual consists of five octaves, or 61 keys. Piano keyboards, by contrast, normally have 88 keys; some electric pianos and digital pianos have fewer keys, such as 61 or 73 keys. Some smaller electronic organs may have manuals of four octaves or less (25, 49, 44, or even 37 keys). Changes in registration through use of drawknobs, stop tabs, or other mechanisms to control organ stops allow such instruments to achieve an aggregate range well in excess of pianos and other keyboard instruments even with manuals of shorter pitch range and smaller size.

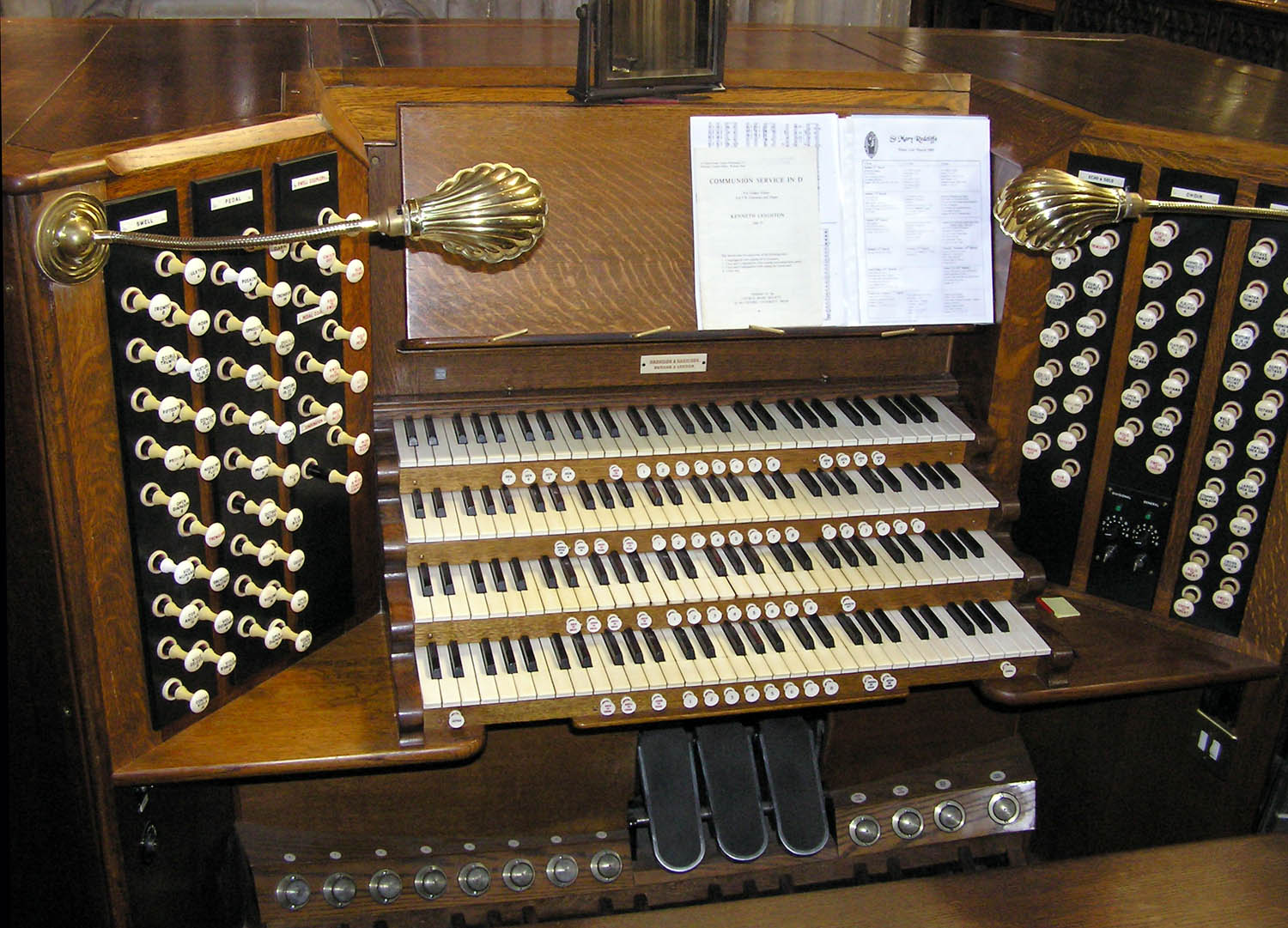
The organ console in St. Mary Redcliffe church in Bristol, England, with four manuals.

On smaller electronic organs and synthesizers, the manuals may span fewer octaves, and they may also be offset, with the lower one an octave to the left of the upper one. This arrangement encourages the organist to play the melody line on the upper manual while playing the harmony line, chords or bassline on the lower manual. On pipe organs each manual plays a specific subset of the organ's stops, and electric organs (e.g., Hammond organ) can emulate this style of play. Hammond organs differ from pipe organs in that pipe organs can only pull a stop out (that is, turn on a stop) or push it in (turning off this stop); in contrast, Hammond organs typically have drawbars, so that the player can control how much of each "pipe rank" (e.g., 16 ft, 8 ft, 4 ft 2 ft, etc.) they wish to use. Synthesizers can program separate manuals to emulate sounds of various orchestral sections or instruments, using imitative digital sounds or sampling of real instruments, or using entirely synthesized sounds. On digital synthesizer instruments a performer can produce the sounds of an entire orchestra through the use of all available manuals in conjunction with the pedalboard and the various registration controls.

== Organ manuals vs. piano keyboards ==
Despite the superficial resemblance to piano keyboards, organ manuals often require a very different style of playing. Organ keys often require less force to depress than piano keys; however, the keys on mechanical instruments can be very heavy (St Sulpice Paris, St Ouen Rouen, St Etienne Caen, etc.). When depressed, an organ key continues to sound its note at the same volume until the organist releases the key, unlike a piano key, whose note gradually fades away as the string vibrations fade away. On the other hand, while the pianist may allow the piano notes to continue to sound for a few moments after lifting their hands from the keys by depressing the sustain pedal, most organs have no corresponding control; the note invariably ceases when the organist releases the key. The exception is some modern electronic instruments and relatively contemporary upgrades to theatre pipe organ consoles, which may have a knee lever which sustains the previous chords or notes. The knee lever enables an organist to hold a chord or note during a fermata or cadence, thus freeing their hands to turn a page in the sheet music, change stops, conduct a choir or orchestra, or shift hands to another manual.

Another difference is that of dynamic control. Unlike the case of piano keys, the force with which the organist depresses the key has no relation to the note's resonance; instead, the organist controls the volume through use of the expression pedals. While the piano note, then, can only decay, the organ note may increase in volume or undergo other dynamic changes. Some modern electronic instruments allow for volume to vary with the force applied to the key and permit the organist to sustain the note and alter both its attack and decay in a variety of ways. For example, Hammond organs often have an expression pedal, which enables the performer to increase or decrease the volume of a note, chord, or passage. All of these variables mean that both the technique of organ playing and the resulting music are quite different from those of the piano. Nevertheless, the trained pianist may play a basic organ repertoire with little difficulty, although more advanced organ music will require specialized training and practice, as the musician has to learn to play on multiple manuals, set stops and other controls while performing, and play the pedal keyboard with the feet.

== Electromechanical organs ==
One of the key types of electromechanical organs, the Hammond B-3, has two manuals. Each manual has drawbars which are used to control the registration for each manuals.

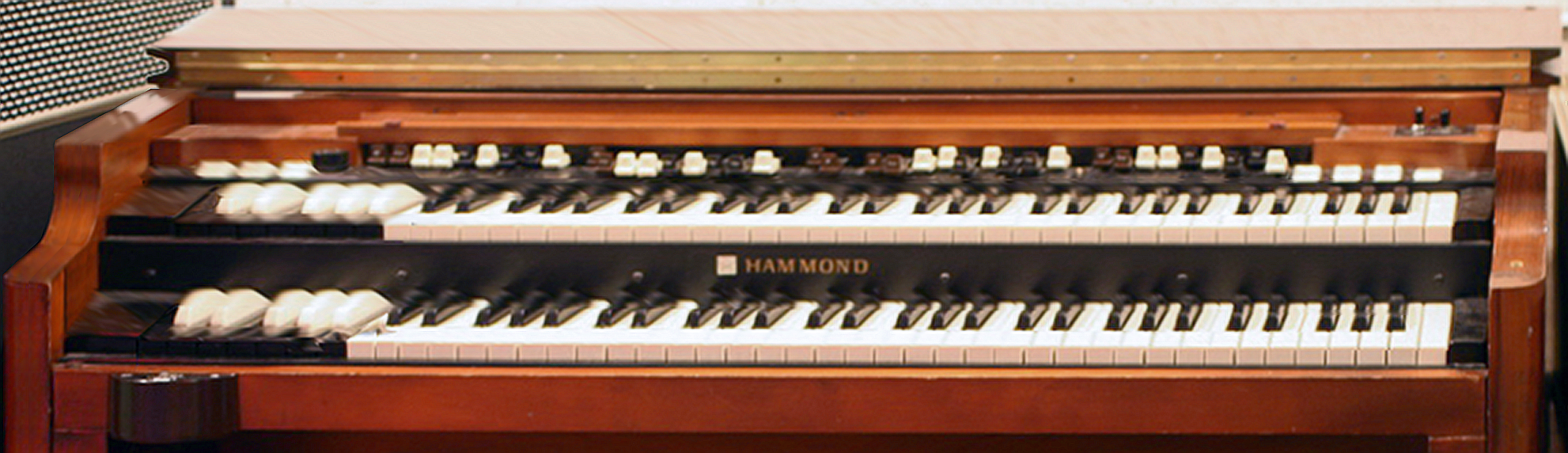
A Hammond B-3 has two manuals.

== Types of manuals and related controls ==
Different manuals on pipe organs are usually used to play stops from a variety of divisions, which group together a series of different tones. Divisions are usually standardised within pipe organs belonging to certain regions; in the English school of organ building, common divisions include the Great, Swell, Choir, Solo and Echo, while French organs commonly include Grand Orgue, Positif, Récit and Echo. German organ divisions include the Hauptwerk, Rückpositiv, Brustwerk and Oberwerk, while in Dutch, common divisions are Hoofdwerk, Rugwerk, Borstwerk and Bovenwerk. Finally, theatre organs are usually composed of Great, Accompaniment, Solo, Bombarde and Orchestral divisions. Organ builders choose different divisions to accommodate the type of music played, the space in which the organ is installed, as well as the desired character and tone of the instrument.

Various other controls, such as stops, pistons, and registration presets are usually located adjacent to the manuals to allow the organist ready access to them while playing. This further increases the instrument's versatility, as a piston or other preset function can cause multiple stops to be pulled out or pushed in automatically. This is of particular benefit in pieces where a number of stops have to be pulled out or pushed in between sections. Devices known as couplers are sometimes available to link the manuals, so that the stops (and pipes) normally played on one can be played from another.

== Gallery ==
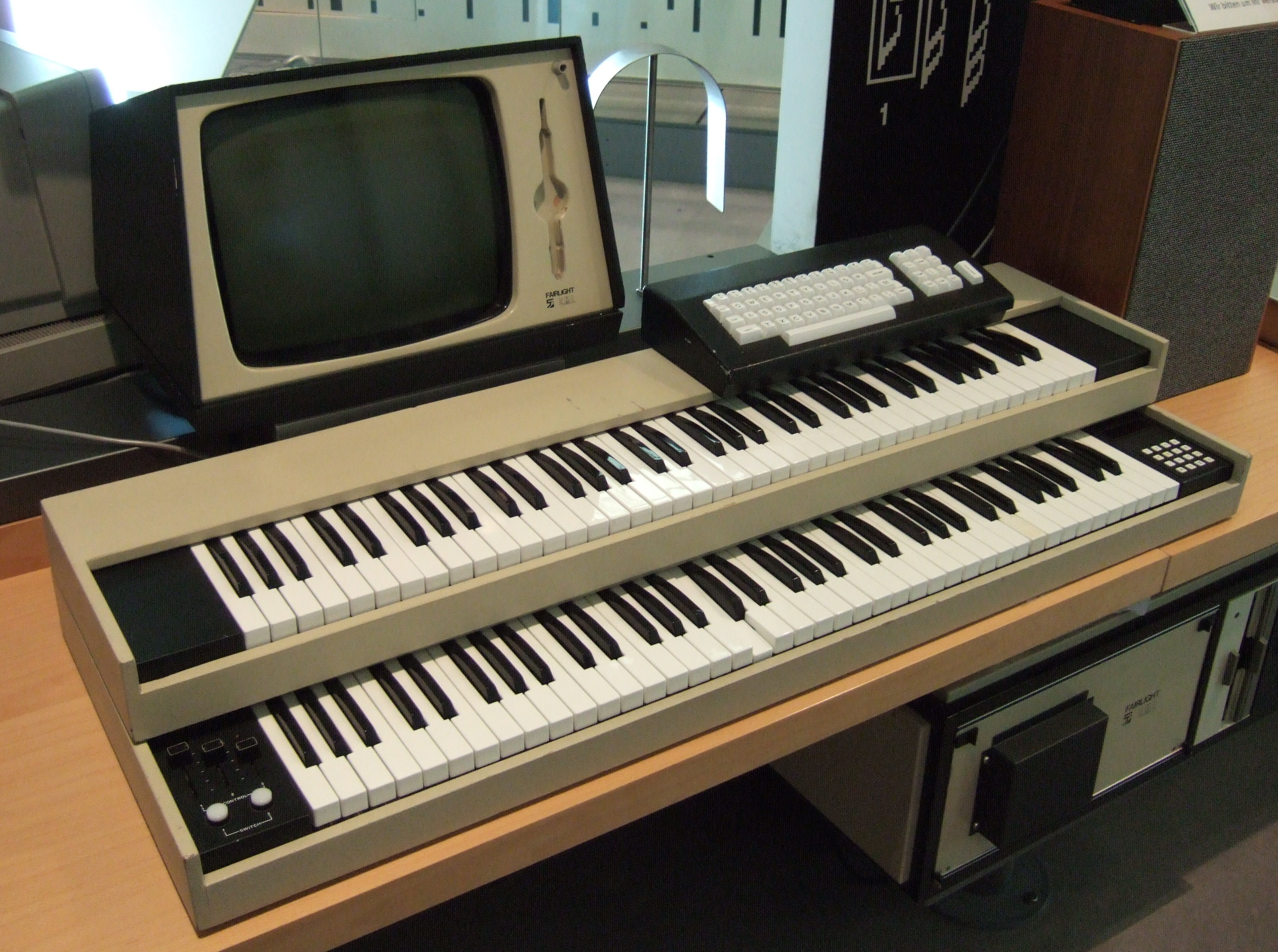
A 1970s-era Fairlight synthesizer with two manuals.

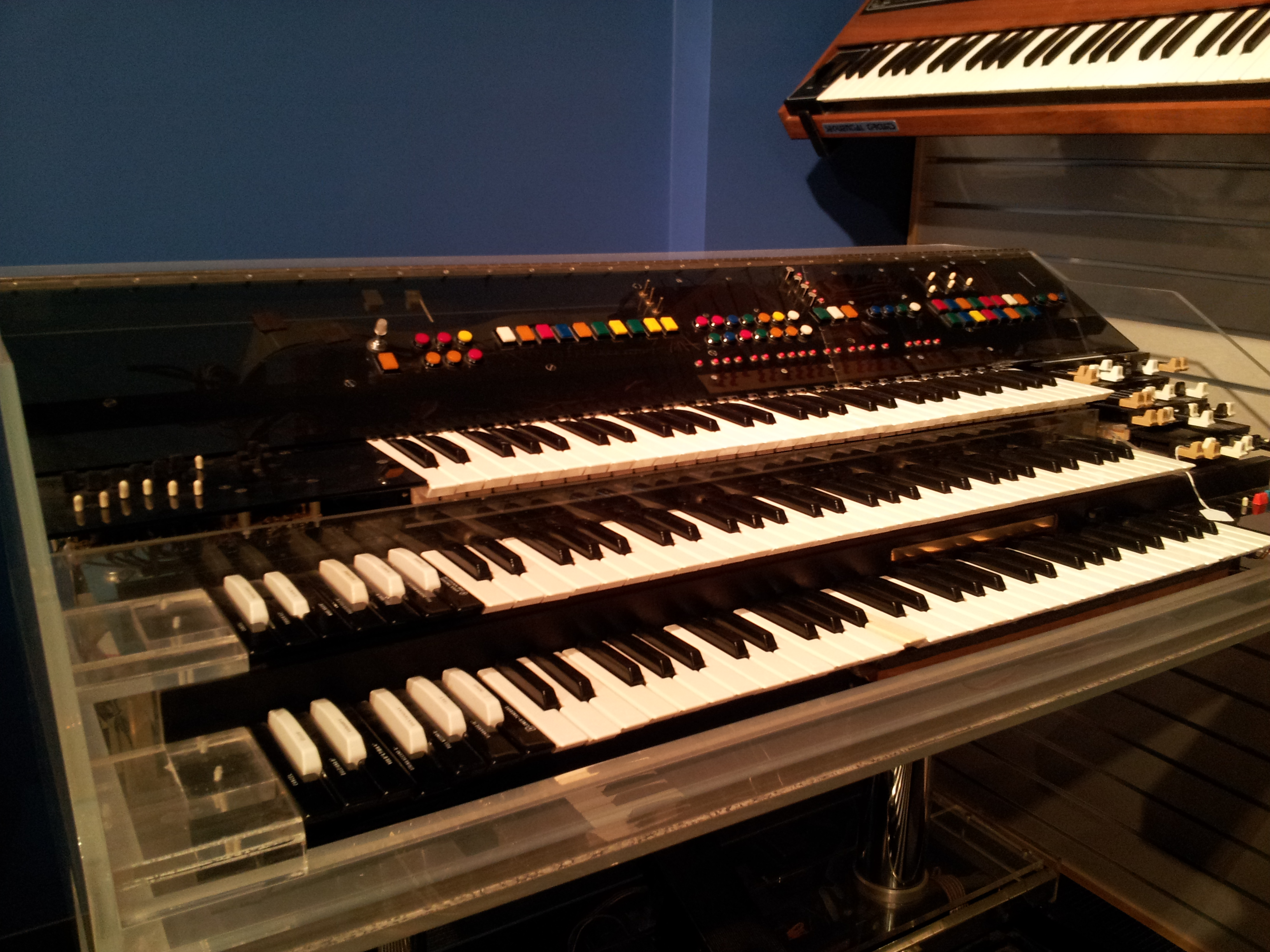
A three manual digital synthesizer organ.

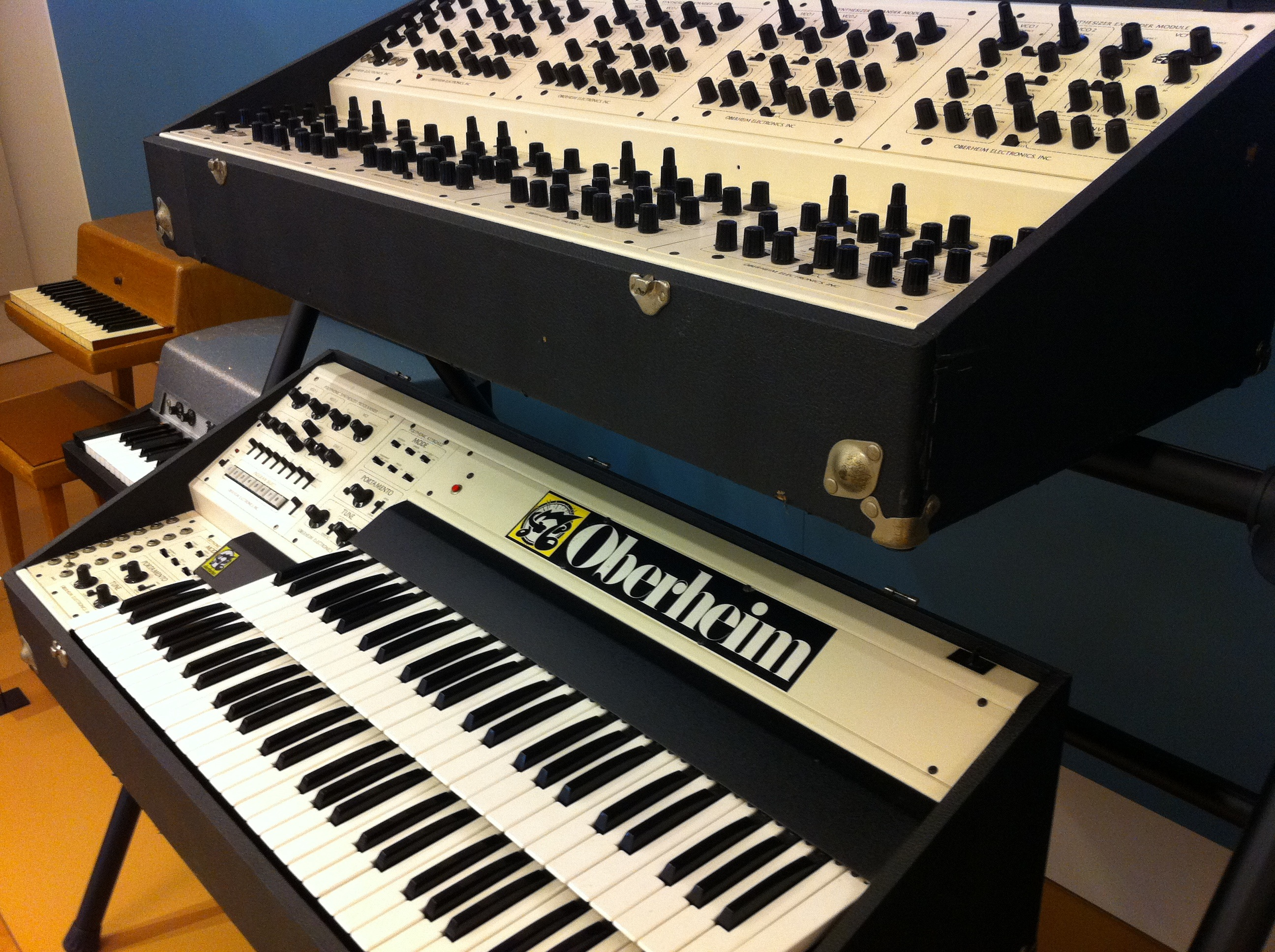
A Custom Oberheim Eight Voice Dual Manual synthesizer.
