= Inertial audio effects controller =

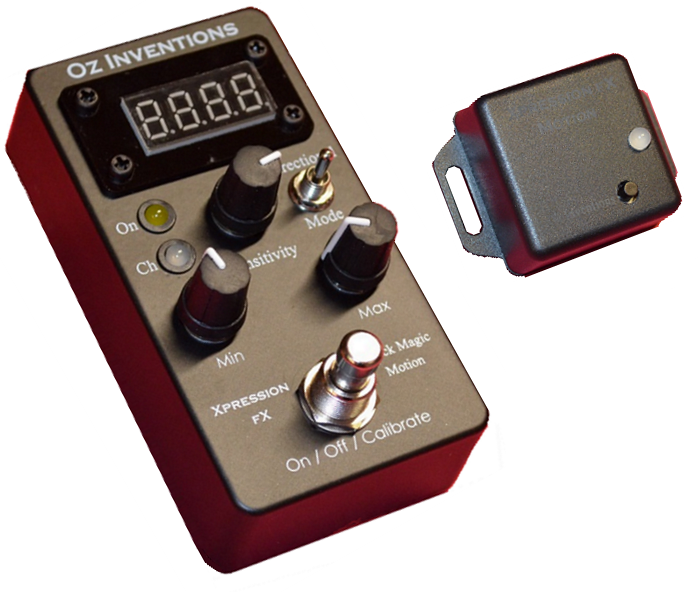
Motion controlled audio effects controller

An inertial audio effects controller is an electronic device that senses changes in acceleration, angular velocity and/or a magnetic field, and relays those changes to an effects controller. Transmitting the sensed data can be done via wired or wireless methods. To be of use the effects controller must be connected to an effect unit so that an effect can be modulated, or connected to a MIDI controller or musical keyboard. The Wah-Wah effect is a classic example of effect modulation.

An inertial audio effects controller can be compared with a traditional expression pedal to explain its function. An inertial effects controller uses an inertial sensor to detect user directed changes, whereas a traditional expression pedal uses an electrically resistive element to detect changes. There are some advantages and disadvantages between the two. The main advantages of inertial control versus a traditional foot pedal, are an increased range of dynamic motion, remote control, finer modulation precision and software enabled features such as motion triggered ADSR envelopes and bi-directional motion control. The main disadvantages are the requirement for a power source and a more complicated setup.

Due to their functional similarity with traditional expression pedals, they have been given the informal name, 'Expression box'.

== Availability ==
Conceivably any or all of the inertial sensors (accelerometer, gyroscope, magnetometer), could be used for effect modulation. However, currently the only commercially available products use acceleration sensing only or acceleration combined with angular velocity, as sensed by a gyroscope.

== Future ==
Inertial control of an audio device, whether wired or wireless, is a relatively recent and growing trend. Technology advances have reduced pricing and size, as well as improved usability and performance of the core components. Specifically the core components are an inertial device called a Mirco- Electro-Mechanical-System (MEMs), a microcontroller, and for wireless systems, a radio frequency transmitter/receiver.
