= Dirk Andries Flentrop =

Dutch organ builder (1910–2003)

Dirk Andries Flentrop (1 May 1910 – 30 November 2003) was a Dutch organ builder. He built or restored many major organs in the United States and in Europe. He was noted for his 1977 restoration of two organs from the 17th and 18th centuries in the Mexico City Metropolitan Cathedral.

== Life ==
Flentrop was born in Zaandam on 1 May 1910. His father Hendrik Wichert Flentrop (1866–1950) founded the Zaandam organ building company Flentrop Orgelbouw in 1903, and Dirk Flentrop learnt the art of organ building in his father's workshop and at the firm of Frobenius in Denmark and at the workshop of Paul Faust in Schwelm, Germany. He shared his father's interest in classical organ design, assisting in restoration of old organs, and decided to devote his career to construction and renovation of organs built following these principles. He became involved in the Organ Reform Movement at an early age. In 1927 he gave a lecture to the Dutch Organist Society in which he advocated tracker action, slider chests, and the Rugpositief. Dirk Flentrop assumed direction of the family firm in 1940. This company, which is known throughout the world, operates in Europe, the United States and South America and now also sells organs to Taiwan and Japan.

To honor his achievements, Flentrop was awarded an honorary doctorate in musicology in 1968 by the American Oberlin College, Ohio for his "pioneering work in classic organ building". Later he received another honorary degree from Duke University in North Carolina. In 1989 he lectured at the American Institute of Organ Builders' annual convention, and in 1982 he was the subject of a book, Flentrop in America, written by the American organist and Smithsonian curator John T. Fesperman. Flentrop died at the age of 93 at his home in Santpoort-Zuid.

== Work ==
Flentrop was responsible for more than 250 new instruments, and over 100 restorations, typically showing unusual respect for existing material. Between 1953 and 1955 Flentrop undertook a major reconstruction on the 1721 Schnitger organ of the "Grote of St. Michaelskerk" in Zwolle, Netherlands in an effort to restore the organ to its original quality. He returned to this task later, with new information about restoration of classical organs, making a series of adjustments over a period of two decades.

Flentrop had an important influence on American organ building in the classical style. His first tracker-action pipe organ in America was ordered by the Anglo-American virtuoso organist E. Power Biggs and installed in the Busch-Reisinger Museum at Harvard University in 1958. That organ (III/27) was then heard numerous times in recitals, recordings and radio broadcasts. The tracker-action pipe organ at First Congregational Church, Branford, Connecticut, installed in 1969, is one of the largest organs in the northeast United States with more than 3400 pipes. The organ's design follows classical 17th- and 18th-century organ building principles. Flentrop designed the 5,000-pipe organ in the Duke University chapel, based on a classically designed 18th century organ. The organ was built in the Netherlands of solid wood, using electricity only to power the blower, and was played there before being dismantled and shipped to the United States. It was first officially played there on Christmas Day, 1976.

His company built the pipe organ in Messiah Lutheran Church in Germantown, Maryland, dedicated on 21 April 1991. The organ is encased in French Oak, with cedar and mahogany used for some of the interior mechanical parts. The organ uses electricity only to supply air, with the keyboards mechanically connected to the pipes. Apart from its excellent acoustical qualities, the instrument is a fine example of woodworking and cabinet making.

== Bibliography ==
- Dirk Andries Flentrop (1986). "The Organs of Mexico City Cathedral" (PDF). Smithsonian Studies in History and Technology. 47. Smithsonian Institution Press.
- John T. Fesperman (1982). Flentrop in America: an account of the work and influence of the Dutch organ builder D.A. Flentrop in the United States, 1939–1977. Sunbury Press. ISBN 0-915548-14-3.
