= Nieuwe Kerk (Katwijk aan Zee) =

Protestant church in Katwijk, Netherlands

Coordinates: 52°12′10″N 4°23′58″E

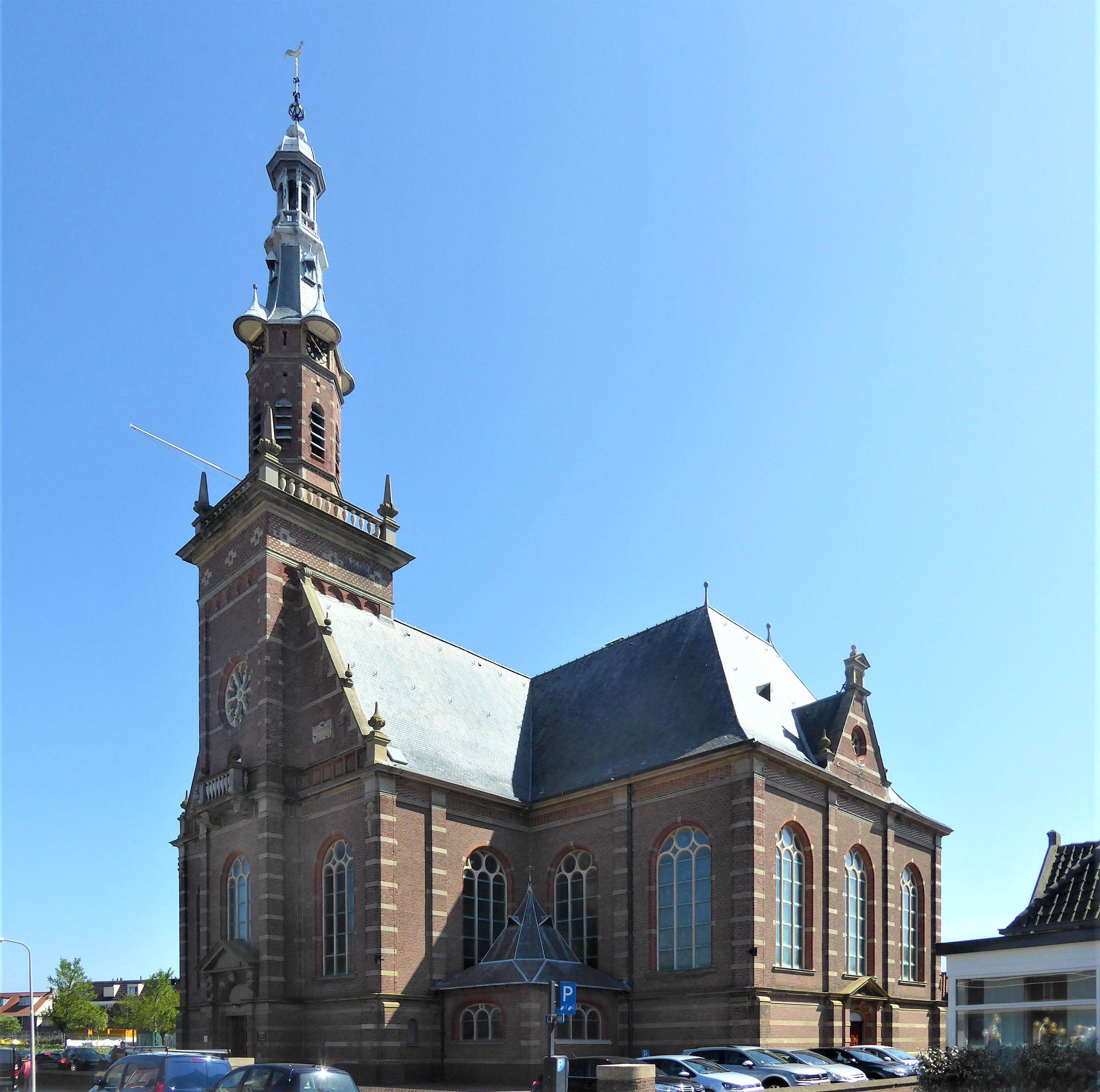
Nieuwe Kerk

The Nieuwe Kerk ("New Church") in Katwijk, the Netherlands, is the oldest and best known work of the architect H.J. Jesse (1860–1943). It was built to replace the nearby Andreaskerk, which had become too small.

== Construction of the church ==
Plans for building a new church were first considered in 1850. The search for a suitable location for the church began in 1883. The church authorities held a design contest, and about 53 designs were sent in. They chose the design of H.J. Jesse. Construction started in 1885, with the first stone being laid by the Baroness Van Wassenaer van Catwijck. The construction took two years, and the new church was opened in 1887. It is now a state monument.

Jesse designed a broad cross-shaped church with 1500 seats. The capacity was later extended to 2000 seats. The building consists of two wide, short aisles and a long transept. The church tower is approximately 51 meters high.

== Gallery ==
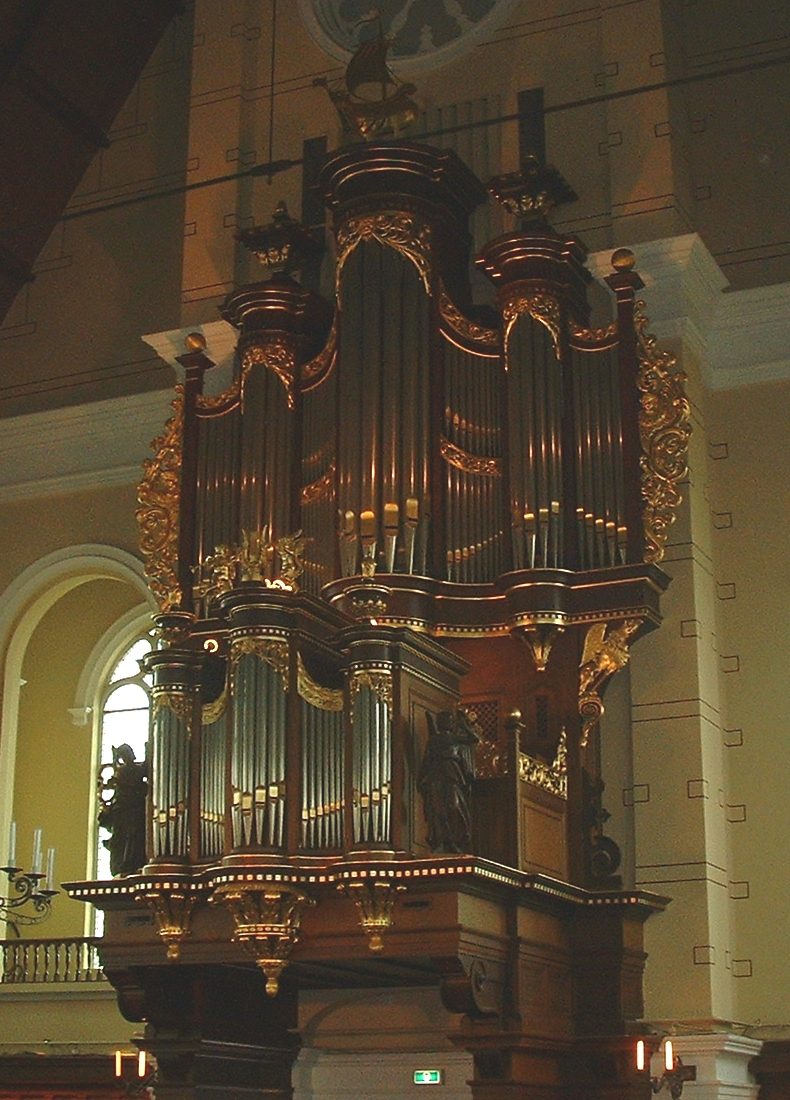
Church organ

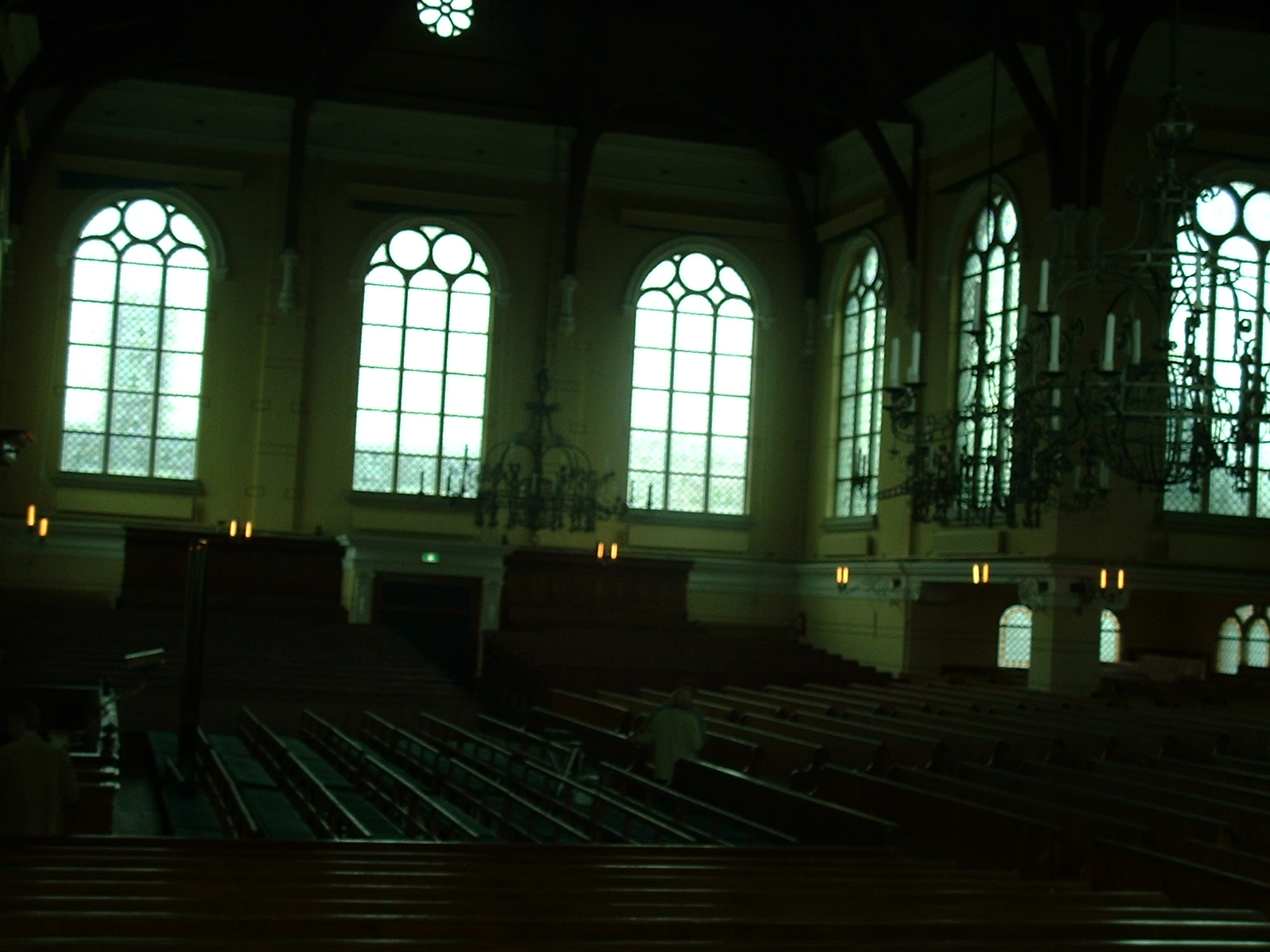
Inside of the church

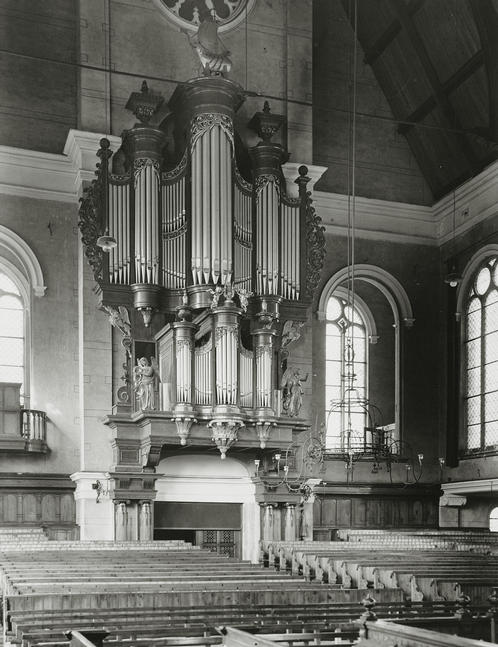
Organ

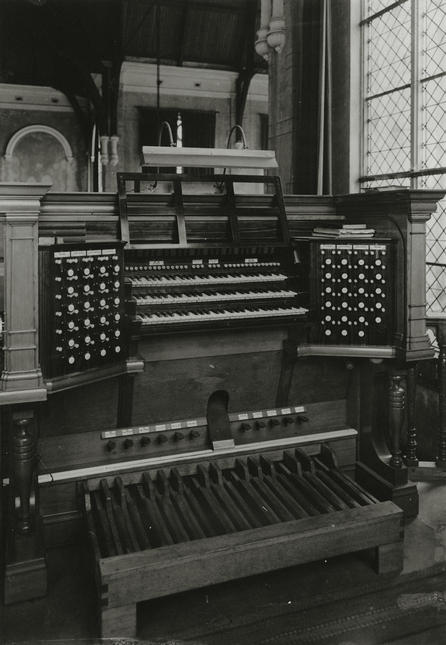
Organ
