= Expression pedal =

Pedal on many musical instruments

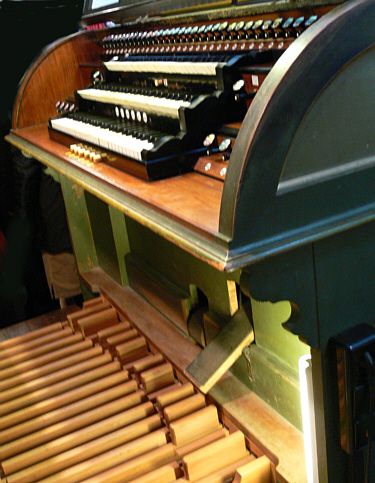
The console of the organ in Salem Minster in Salem, Germany (Wilhelm Schwarz, 1901). The expression pedal is clearly visible directly above the pedalboard.

An expression pedal is an important control found on many musical instruments including organs, electronic keyboards, and pedal steel guitar. The musician uses the pedal to control different aspects of the sound, commonly volume. Separate expression pedals can often be added to a guitar amplifier or effects unit and used to control many different aspects of the tone.

Because the source of power with a pipe organ and electronic organs is not generated by the organist, the volume of these instruments has no relationship with how hard its keys or pedals are struck; i.e., the organ produces the same volume whether the key or pedal is depressed gently or firmly. Moreover, the tone will remain constant in pitch, volume, and timbre until the key or pedal is lifted, at which point the sound stops. The expression pedal gives the organist control over the external source of power, and thus the volume, of the instrument, while leaving the user's hands free.

This system of dynamic control is completely distinct from the act of adding stops (in the case of pipe organs) or pulling more drawbars (in the case of organs and synthesizers). Furthermore, the expression pedal can influence the volume (and, to a lesser degree, the timbre) of a note while it is being played; unlike other instruments, in which the note typically decays after it is first sounded, the organist can increase the strength of a chord or note as it sounds by increasing pressure on the expression pedal.

An organ expression pedal is typically a large pedal, resembling an oversized automobile accelerator, either partially or fully recessed within the organ console and located either directly above or to the right of the organ's pedalboard. As the pedal is pressed forward with the toes, the volume of the sound is increased; as it is depressed with the heel, the volume is decreased. A stand-alone expression pedal used with electronic keyboards, amplifiers, and effects is usually a smaller pedal made of metal or plastic that can be placed on the floor and then connected to the device with an instrument cable.

Swell box
on the Holtkamp organ in Bishop W. Angie Smith Chapel, Oklahoma City University

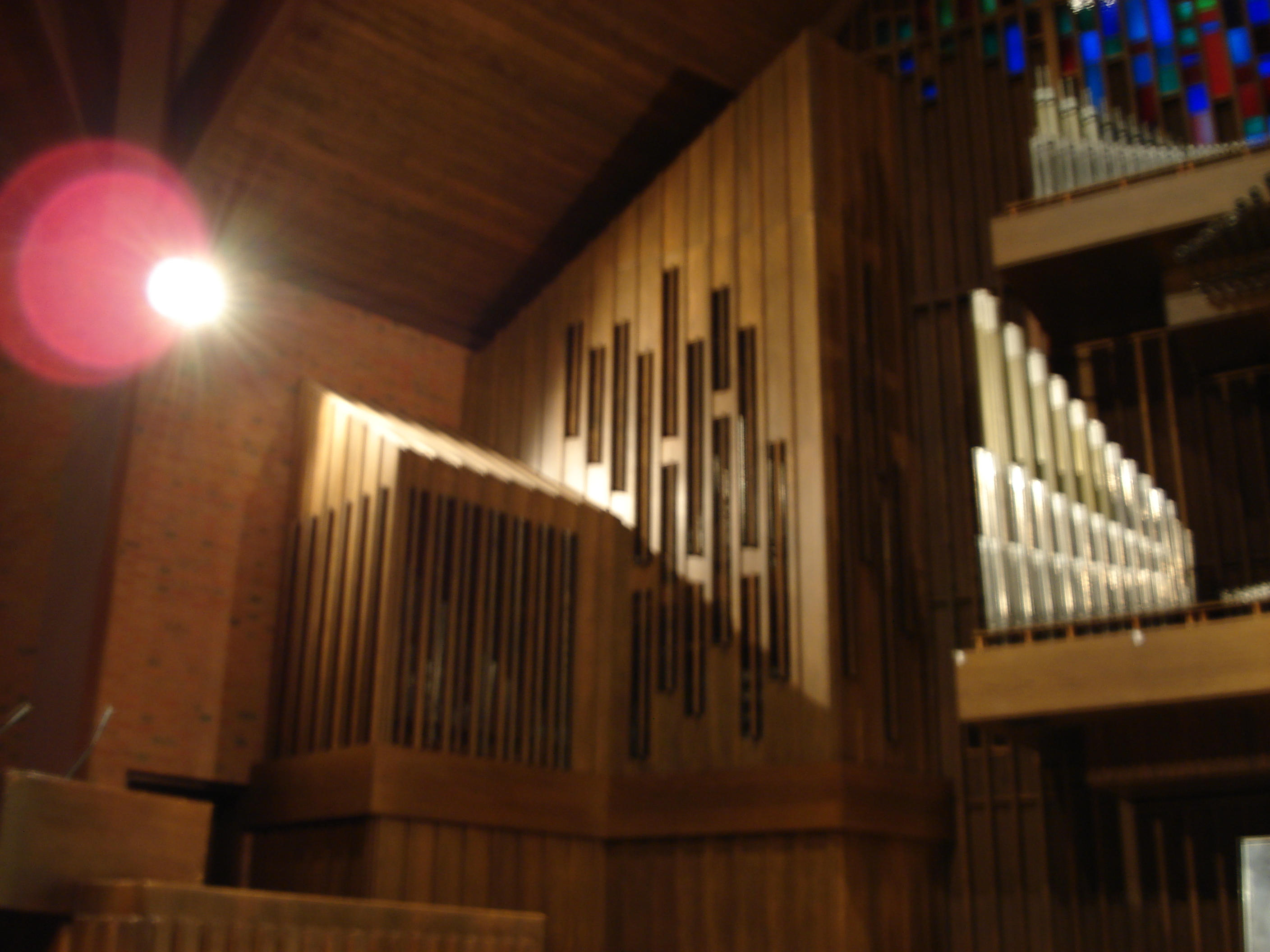
Here, the shutters are open.

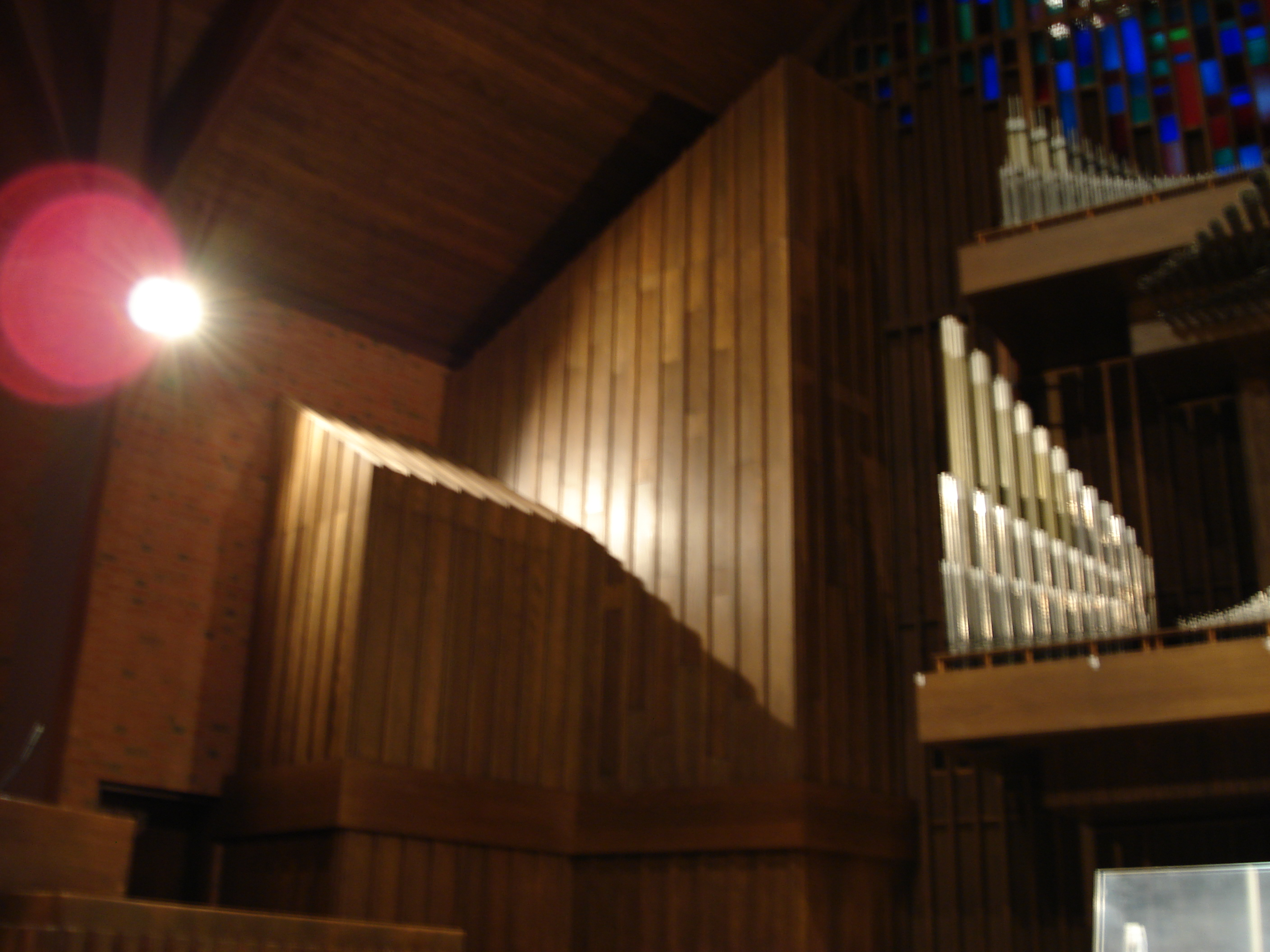
Swell box with shutters closed.

== Pipe organs ==
Beginning in the nineteenth century, it became common for one or more divisions of pipes in a pipe organ to be enclosed in a wooden box, at least one side of which would consist of palettes that open and close in a manner similar to a Venetian blind. A mechanical (later electrical) mechanism connected the box to a pedal that the organist would use to open and close the shutters, adjusting the perceived loudness of the sound. When the box is shut (or closed), less sound is released into the venue. In American and British organs, the enclosed division is usually named the Swell, and the box surrounding the pipes is usually referred to as the swell box. Thus, the expression pedal is sometimes known as the swell pedal or swell shoe. Sometimes the swell pedal is referred to by its German name, schweller. Larger organs may have two or more expression pedals, allowing the volume of different divisions to be individually controlled.

No matter how well a swell box is designed, the sound of the pipes is altered by their enclosure. Even when the shutters are fully opened, the pipes do not speak as clearly into the room as they would if they were otherwise unenclosed. In some instances and applications, particularly for the performance of Romantic organ music, enclosure in an expression chamber can remove some of the shrillness of organ pipes. Romantic instruments frequently have more than one division (keyboard) under expression. On pipe organs, the expression pedal should not be confused with the crescendo pedal, which progressively adds stops as it is opened, building from piano to fortissimo.

=== Ratchet swell lever ===
Historically, the palettes were manipulated by a ratchet swell, a lever operated by the foot to the side of the console. The lever would fit into two or three different notches, which would lock the position of the lever, and therefore the shutters, in place. To change the position of the shutters, the lever would be kicked sideways to allow it to travel into a new position. The lever was weighted so that its default position was at the top, with the shutters closed. As the lever was lowered, the shutters would open.

=== Balanced swell pedal ===
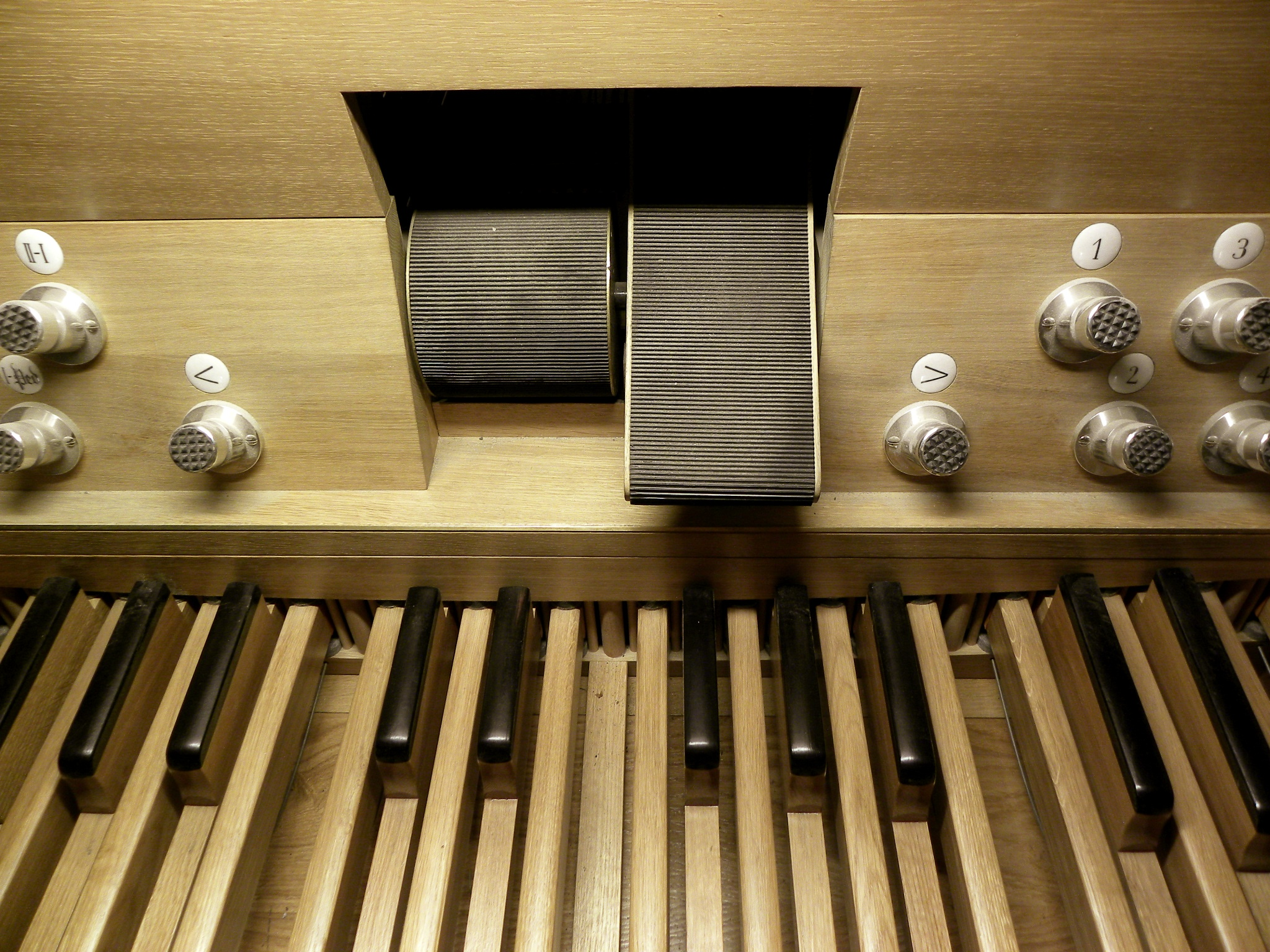
Crescendo roller (left) and Swell pedal (right)

The balanced swell pedal (as pictured above) was developed in the late nineteenth century so that the opening of the box could be fixed at any degree (not just the two or three options of the ratchet swell). This pedal is fitted above the center of the pedalboard. It usually rotates towards and away from the organist through a distance of about 90° from an almost vertical position ("shut") to a near horizontal position ("open"). Because the pedal is balanced, the organist does not need to hold it in position, and it will balance at any point in its travel. In addition, this location for most expression pedals, above the center of the pedalboard, is much more convenient for use by both feet if necessary (although it is usually operated with the right foot).

=== Comparison: rachet lever vs. balanced pedals ===
Correspondence to The Musical Times in 1916 debates the merits of both the ratchet lever and balanced pedal systems of expression. One writer suggests that balanced expression pedals are either too sensitive or not sensitive enough and are unable to produce effective sforzandos (though many improvements have been made since this letter was written), and that he knows many organists who are having balanced expression pedals removed. One organist most open to the change suggests that real crescendos and diminuendos are not possible with a ratchet swell lever, as the notches provided are always either just under or just above the required dynamic level. Furthermore, he states that the balanced expression pedal affords the ease of use of either foot, whereas the previous correspondent desired two ratchet levers, one at either side of the pedalboard.

=== Other expression technologies ===
In 1933, Aubrey Thompson-Allen created the "Infinite Speed and Gradation Swell Engine," based on the work of Henry Willis III, the grandson of Father Henry Willis. The mechanism allowed for an infinitesimally slow as well as an instantaneous opening and closing of the swell shades. The spring-loaded expression pedal sits in what would be a half-open position on a normal balanced pedal. The mechanism opens the swell shades at a speed relative to how far the expression pedal is pressed. This uncommon device requires a completely different expressive technique than the balanced expression pedal. It is found on very few organs.

== Reed organs and harmoniums ==
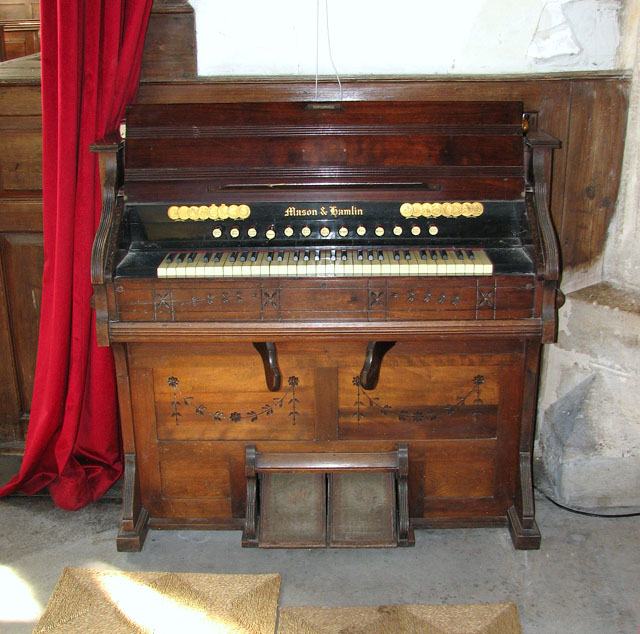
Swell levers on harmonium

Reed organs and harmoniums of the late nineteenth and early twentieth centuries featured a pair of bellows pedals at the base of the instrument. When the pedals were pumped up and down, air was drawn across the organ's reeds, producing sound. This capability made the harmonium widely available to homes and small churches, though the dynamic range tended to be limited (not to mention that the organist would eventually tire from pumping). However, these free-reed organs had several ways of controlling their volume and expression. Unlike a pipe organ with a blower, the wind pressure of the reed organ can be directly controlled by varying the speed the bellows are operated with the feet, providing a means of producing softer or harsher tones. Harmoniums (where the bellows provided a positive pressure) usually had an air reservoir to reduce the effort needed to pump the bellows when many stops were engaged.

However, some instruments had a system to bypass the reservoir if the player wanted more direct control. Reed organs often had a form of swell shutter mechanism. The bellows system and reed ranks were contained in a wooden frame. By covering this frame, a swell box was created. A single shutter in the top of the box, inside the organ case, allowed the volume to be controlled. Since the player's feet were needed to operate the bellows, the swell shutter was controlled by a lever operated by the player's knee. The lever operated horizontally, and the player pushed their knee towards the side of the instrument to open the shutter. The lever returned to the 'closed' position on a spring or a locking mechanism could be engaged to hold the shutter open.

Subsequently, the electrically powered reed organ, and later the electronic organ, allowed the bellows pedals to be replaced with an expression pedal, allowing the organist to effect a more substantial change in volume more easily than was possible with the manually pumped instrument.

== Electronic organs ==
Pedals of an electronic console organ

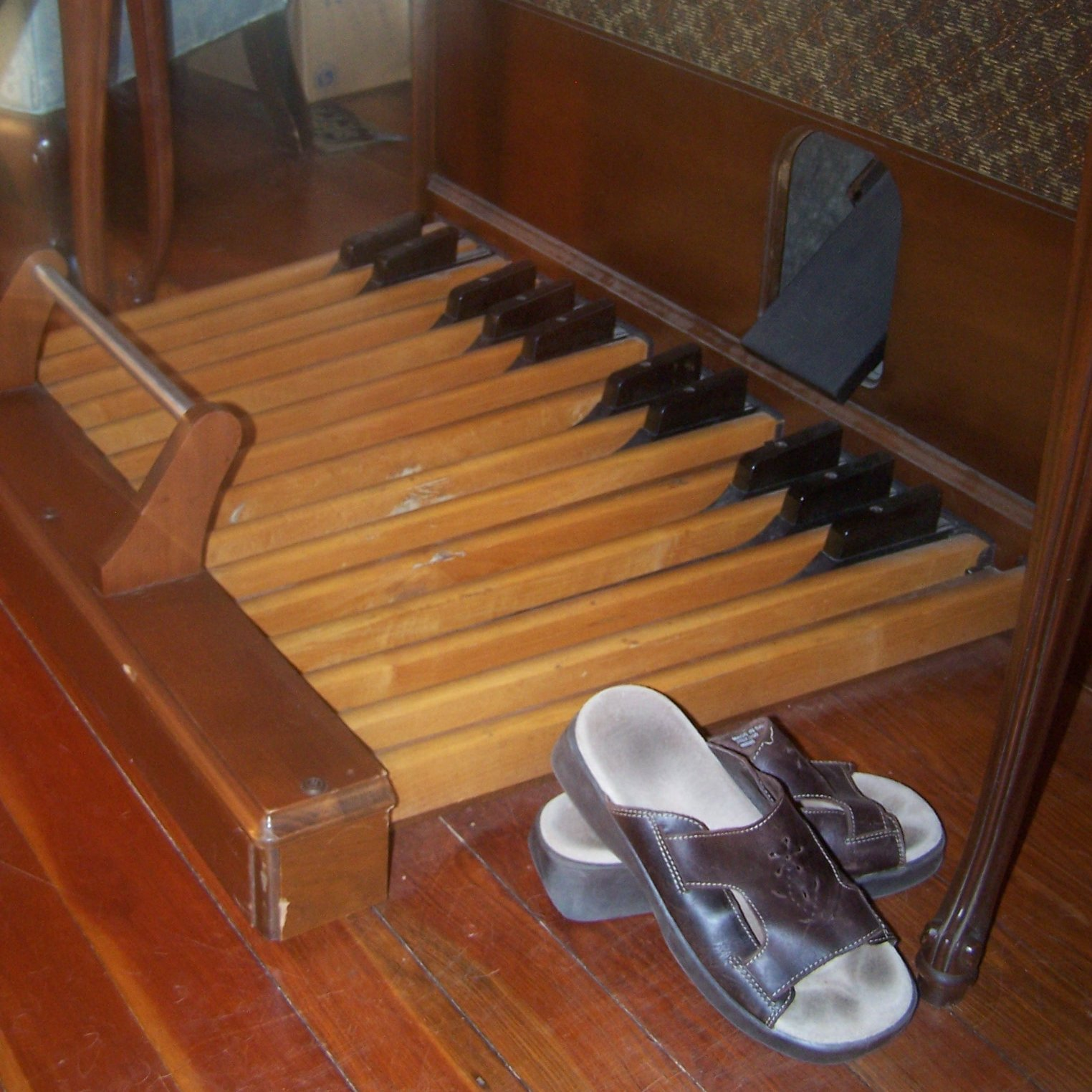
The expression pedal is the large one above the pedalboard.
Depending on the style of music, the organist may keep the right foot on the expression pedal throughout their performance and plays the pedalboard with the left; at other times the organist uses both feet to play the pedalboard or shifts the right foot between the pedalboard and expression pedal.
Note that the footrest at the back of this pedalboard, being offset to the left, is designed for the left foot only, which encourages the organist to rest the right foot on (and thus actively use) the expression pedal.

The style of popular organ music of the 20th and 21st centuries such as jazz is highly dynamic and requires constant use of the expression pedal in a fashion very different from that of classical organ literature. This tendency increased with the arrival of spinet organs and modern synthesizers, which offset the expression pedal and reduced the size of the pedalboard. These changes allowed the organist to keep the right foot constantly on the expression pedal, while playing the pedalboard with only the left foot. This ability encouraged organists to operate the expression pedal more often during playing. To take advantage of this style of playing, some expression pedals on modern electronic organs are equipped with toe switches, which allow the organist to make quick registration changes without removing the foot from the pedal.

Expression pedals may be non-linear in response, meaning that slight pressure changes may cause a greater proportional change in volume than a more complete depression. In this regard, each organ tends to be rather distinct.

== Guitars and digital effects ==
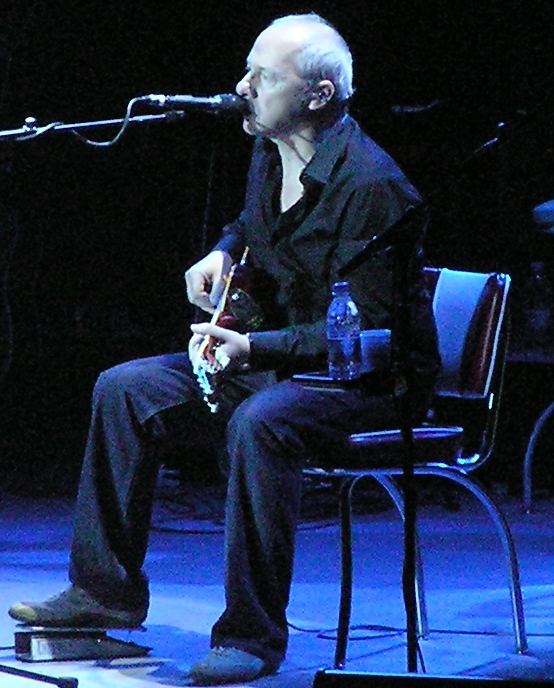
Mark Knopfler using an effects pedal (2006)

While most electronic effects units for electric guitar use footswitches to turn an effect on and off, some guitar effects, such as wah, vibrato, and swell, use a variable treadle-style pedal control similar to a keyboard expression pedal. Historically, these have been built into dedicated pedals for each effect, but modern digital amplifiers and processors allow many different effects to be built into a single, small floor or rack mount unit. Special built-in or plug-in expression pedals can be used with these devices to allow control of multiple effects with a single expression pedal.

Using the expression pedal, the musician can not only emulate dedicated effects such as wah, but also have real time control of almost any variable such as volume, tone, echo repeats, effect speed, and so on. Some guitar expression pedals include integrated toe switches similar to those for some electric organs. The switches provide even more control, allowing the musician to turn effects on and off, and switch between different amplifiers.

Expression has been taking a detour from pedals with advances in technology making smaller and remote devices possible. Motion controlled expression devices also called inertial audio effects controllers perform the same function as an expression pedal but provided added dexterity, movement dynamics and features.

== Synthesizers ==
Expression pedals are typically used to control a range of synthesizer functions and effects parameters in real time. The most common type of pedal contains a simple potentiometer, mechanically linked to the pedal mechanism and electrically connected to the synthesizer, most commonly with a 1/4" TRS plug. Such pedals either require a built-in analogue pedal input, or must be converted to MIDI or USB for use with software synthesizers running on computers, using one of the commercially available pedal interfaces.
