= Residence organ =

Musical organ installed in a personal home

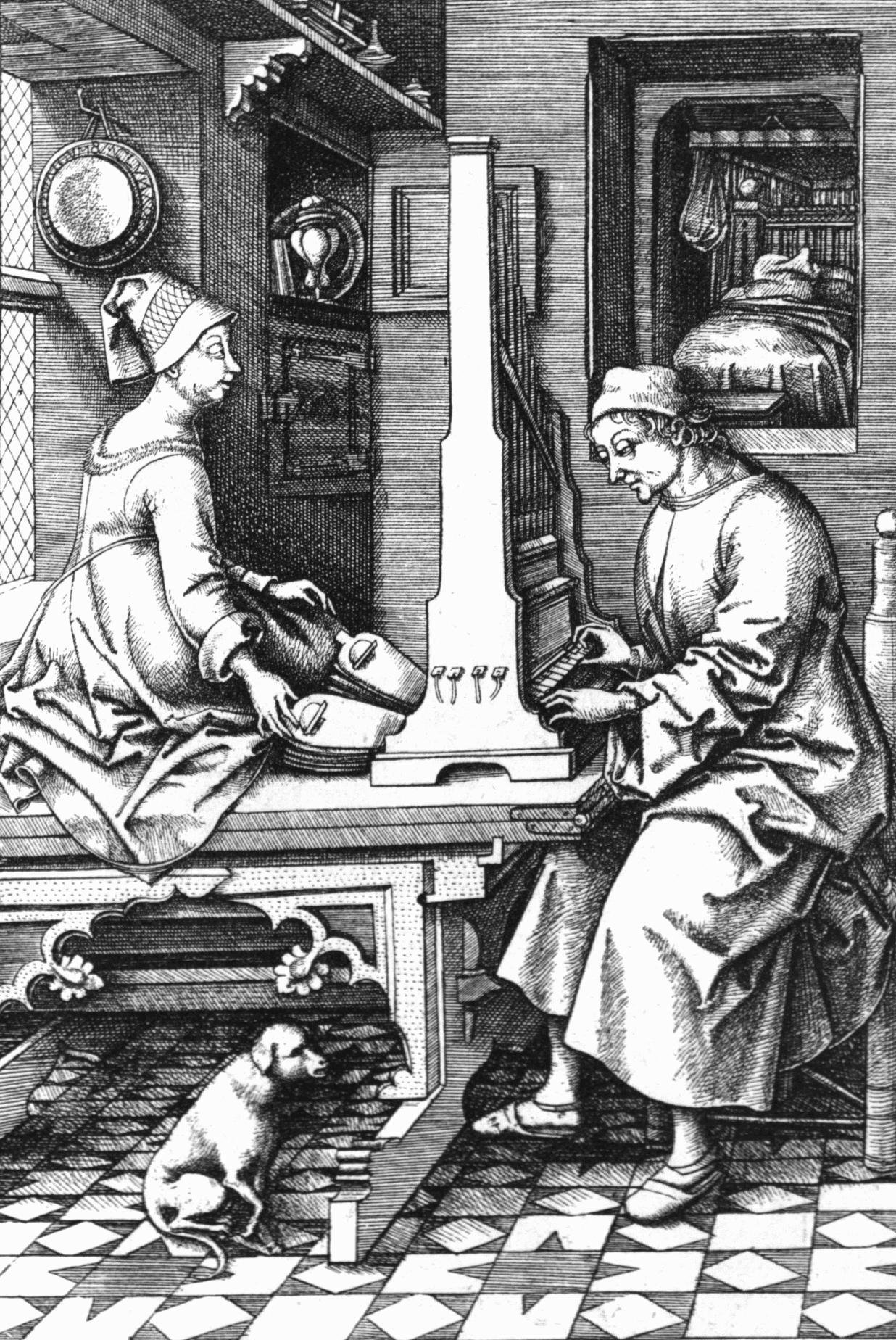
This picture by Israhel van Meckenem the Younger illustrates a very early type, of the many types, of residence organ, in this instance a single manual pipe organ powered by air pumped via two hand bellows by the organist's wife. The four levers at the side are probably decorations, but could have been slider controls.

A residence organ (also known variously as a house, box, cabinet, choir, continuo, home, practice, trunk, or chamber organ) is a musical organ installed in a personal home. Strictly speaking, the names residence and house organ are the most correct, the others being types of organs that can physically be used as residence organs, but that are not restricted to use solely in that context, and can also be used in, say, small churches, theatres, and so forth. A portative organ or a positive organ (which are also, but imprecisely, known as box, trunk, and cabinet organs) can be used in a residential setting, but the notion of a residence organ strictly embodies a permanence of place that is belied by the notion of portability embodied by the portatives and positives. Similarly, a chamber organ (also known imprecisely as a cabinet, desk, or bureau organ) is in general a small organ for a room, but not necessarily for a room of someone's home.

== Use, construction, and evolution ==
The overlap of definitions parallels an overlap of uses. Residence organs can be used as practice organs, for practice at home by a professional organist, or as home instruments for amateur organists. Their use can be traced as far back as the 16th century where Henry VIII of England owned more than a dozen residence organs, as did many members of his nobility.

In construction, they are generally less elaborate than church organs, being constricted by the relative paucity of space for the mechanisms in a residence as opposed to a church, theatre, or other larger building. They commonly have no pedals, a few stops, and a single manual. They are also generally less ornate than other kinds of organs, having plainer façades as the major effort in their construction goes towards miniaturization of the mechanism and achieving a church organ sound with domestic acoustics.

Various construction techniques are employed in pursuit of the latter goal. The lengthy pipework of the low registers in a church organ simply doesn't fit into a home, and so devices such as a quint, a Haskell bass, and a stopped pipe are employed to achieve the same sound but with more compact mechanisms.

The action is also engineered for compactness. In early designs, the action was very simple and comprised a sprung arrangement where air was compressed in the lower chest of the organ, and depressing a key would open a pallet that would release the air up to the pipe ranks. Later designs, as technology progressed, started to encompass more of what could be found in church and other organs and more complex mechanisms, including rollerboards, pedalboards, reed organs (rather than pipes), and eventually electric rather than mechanical actions.

Such residence organs were the province of professional house organ makers (who continue to exist even today) in the main, with a notable exception of Toggenburg where (at that time) residence organs were often constructed by amateurs and enthusiasts themselves. Several such purpose-built residence organs survive from centuries past, including Claudio Merulo's organ in the Parma Conservatory, and the residence organ of Marie Antoinette that is preserved at Versailles. For comparison, out of the 761 residence organs built by Aeolian between 1894 and 1932, only 65 survived to the end of the 20th century. (One such was the one at Longwood Gardens in Pennsylvania.)

Residence organs rose to greater popularity in the 17th century, and by the 18th century much larger ones were being built, in England, Holland, and France. It was the end of the 19th century and the turn of the 20th that saw the advent of large and complex purpose-built residence organs in the private homes of those wealthy enough to afford such things, usually not played by the owners themselves but by professional organists whose services they would hire, for private concerts and the like. A four-manual organ was built in Blenheim Palace in 1891 by the Willis company, for example, and such things were symbols of ostentation and opulence on the parts of their owners.

But things changed in the 20th century with the advent of new technologies. Right at the start of the century the paper-roll playing mechanisms of the pianola were incorporated into residence organs, which had the side-effect of eliminating the profession of residence organist, requiring the operator to do no more than operate the organ stops and expression pedals (which, in its turn, was eliminated within a decade, that too being encoded onto the paper roll itself). Residence organs in the 1930s grew to encompass an even wider range of instruments with the advent of the electronic organ and (later) the analogue synthesizer as home organs. There has been a "purist" backlash against these; and even today one can find companies that will build "real" (i.e. not electronic) residential organs, customized for individual homes. But by the turn of the 21st century, with a few occasional exceptions, it was the electronic organ and the synthesizer to which professionals and amateurs now turned to for practice and informal use at home.

== See also ==
- Aeolian-Skinner
