= Flentrop =

Dutch company based in Zaandam

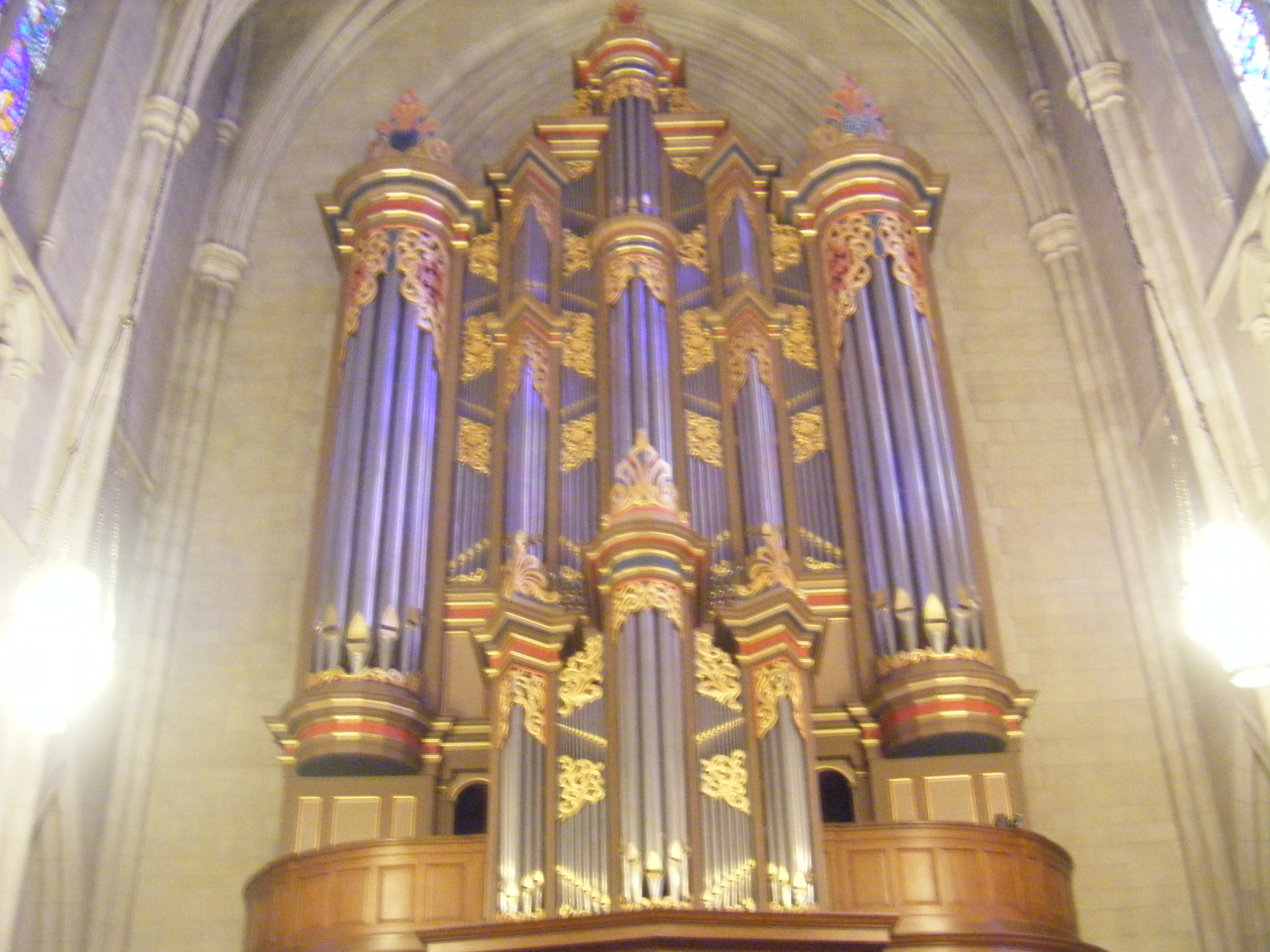
Flentrop organ in Duke Chapel (North Carolina)

Flentrop is a Dutch company based in Zaandam that builds and restores organs.

== History ==
The company originated in 1903 when Hendrik Wicher Flentrop (1866-1950) from Koog aan de Zaan, originally a house painter by trade, and organist at the Westzijderkerk in Zaandam, started a piano and organ company. He believed that old organs could not be adapted to contemporary tastes, but had valid sound nonetheless. In 1915, after he had gained experience with restoration and enlargement of organs, he built his first new organ. Beginning in 1922 he corresponded with Albert Schweitzer, which resulted in pronounced opinions concerning the demands which had to be made on the organ.

Dirk Andries Flentrop (1910-2003), son of Hendrik Wicher Flentrop and Christina Anna Dekker, took control of the company in 1940. Important organs, such as that of Hans van Covelen in the large church at Alkmaar, and the Schnitger organs in the large church at Zwolle and the Laurenskerk in Alkmaar, were restored. In addition, he built numerous instruments in the United States (most notably for Adolphus Busch Hall at Harvard University and St. Mark's Cathedral in Seattle), and restored two in Mexico City.

J. A. Steketee (b. 1936) led the company from 1976 to 1998. Under his direction, the organ of Johannes Duyschot in the Westzijderkerk at Zaandam was restored. Tasks were also carried out in foreign countries: Taipei, Riga, Tokyo, Dunblane, Kazan, and Yerevan. Additionally, the organ of the Holy Name Cathedral was built in Chicago, and in the Netherlands the organs of the Westerkerk and the Concertgebouw, and the St. John's Cathedral, were restored.

Cees van Oostenbrugge was managing director from 1998 until his death in 2008. During his tenure, a new restoration was carried out of the Hans van Covelen organ, which is the oldest playable organ of the Netherlands, originally built in 1511.

Frits Elshout was managing director from 2008 through 2016, followed by Erik Winkel.

All directors have also been church organists.
