= Johann Vexo =

French organist

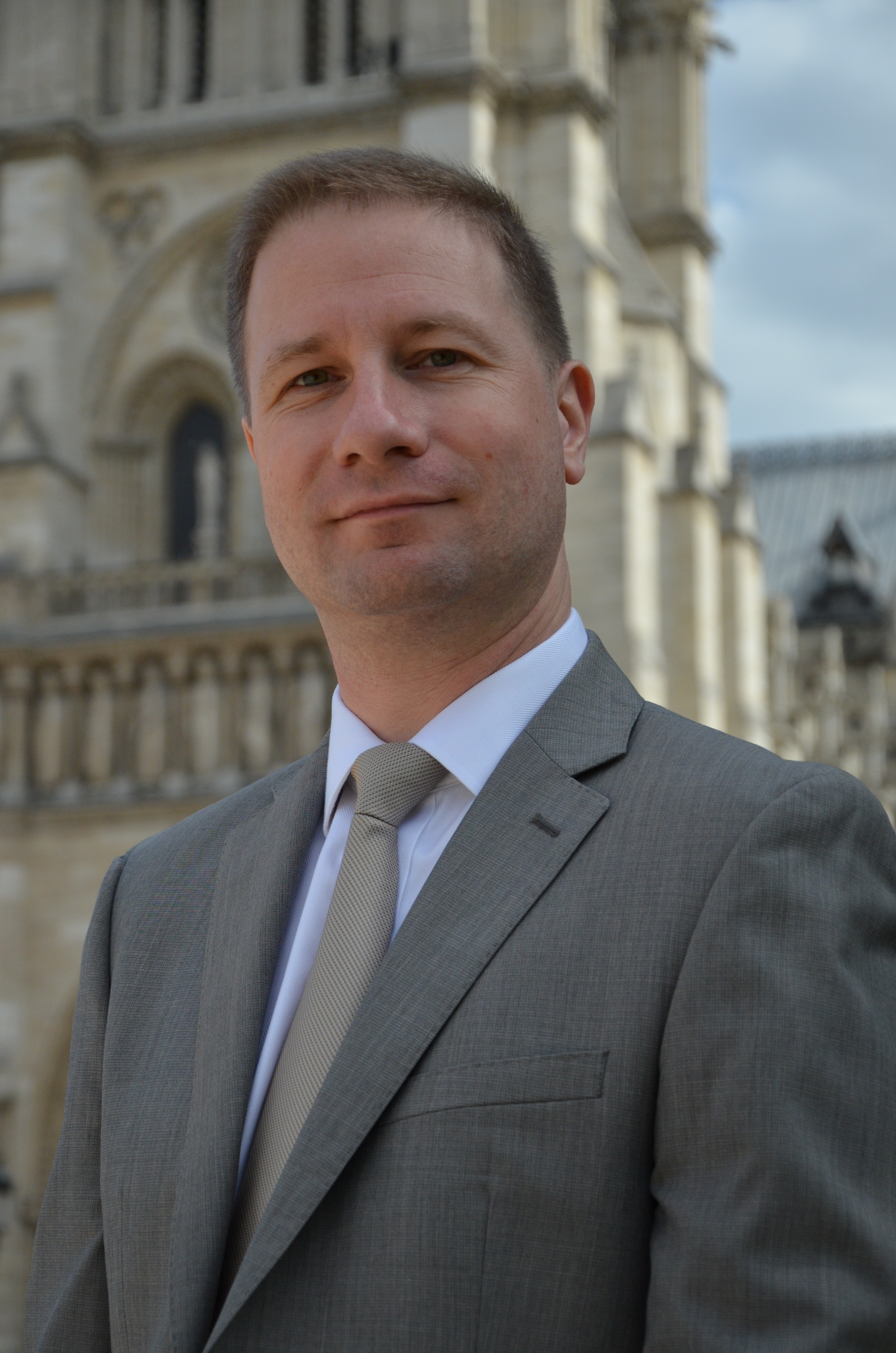
Vexo at Parvis Notre-Dame – Place Jean-Paul II (21 September 2015)

Johann Vexo (born 1978) is a French organist. He is the organist for both the choir organ at Notre Dame de Paris (as deputy) and the great organ of Nancy Cathedral (as titular).

== Biography ==
Born in Nancy, Johann Vexo first studied organ with Christophe Mantoux, as well as early music and harpsichord at the Conservatory of Strasbourg, where he was awarded Premier Prix in organ. He continued his studies at the Conservatoire National Supérieur de Musique of Paris where his teachers included Michel Bouvard and Olivier Latry for organ, Thierry Escaich and Philippe Lefebvre for improvisation. He earned Premier Prix in both organ and basso continuo and additional prizes in harmony and counterpoint.

At the age of 25, he was appointed Choir Organist of Notre-Dame cathedral in Paris. Soon thereafter he was also appointed Organist of the Cavaillé-Coll great organ of the Cathedral in Nancy. After teaching at the Angers Conservatory for 10 years, he is now Professor of Organ at the Conservatory and at the Superior Music Academy in Strasbourg.

== Performances ==
Vexo has performed extensively throughout Europe, the United States, Canada, Australia, New Zealand and Russia. He has appeared as a featured artist in numerous international music festivals and organ series in cities such as Atlanta, Auckland, Dallas, Düsseldorf, Los Angeles, Melbourne, Montreal, Moscow, New York, Porto, Riga and Vienna. His performances have also included notable venues such as the Basilica of the National Shrine in Washington DC, the Wanamaker Grand Court in Philadelphia, the KKL in Lucerne, the St. Mary’s Cathedral in Sydney and the Yekaterinburg Philharmonic Hall.

He has also performed with various orchestras and musical ensembles. He has been invited to teach organ master classes for the American Guild of Organists and at prestigious institutions including Rice University in Houston, the Curtis Institute of Music in Philadelphia, Westminster Choir College in Princeton and Aveiro University (Portugal). He has recorded several CDs on historical French organs, especially one for JAV recordings on the great organ of Notre Dame Cathedral in Paris. Vexo is represented by Phillip Truckenbrod Concert Artists, LLC.

== Discography ==
- Works by Liszt, Franck, Vierne, Duruflé, Escaich on the great organ of Notre-Dame de Paris, JAV recordings, Washington DC, 2010
- Works by Bach, Clérambault, Couperin, Grigny, Guilain, Marchand, Séjan on the historical organ of Vézelise (France), Amis de l'orgue de Vézelise, 2007
- Works by Mendelssohn, Brahms, Schumann, Liszt on the historical organ of Réchésy (France), Festival de Masevaux, 2005
