= Great organ of Nancy Cathedral =

Pipe organ in Nancy Cathedral, Nancy, France

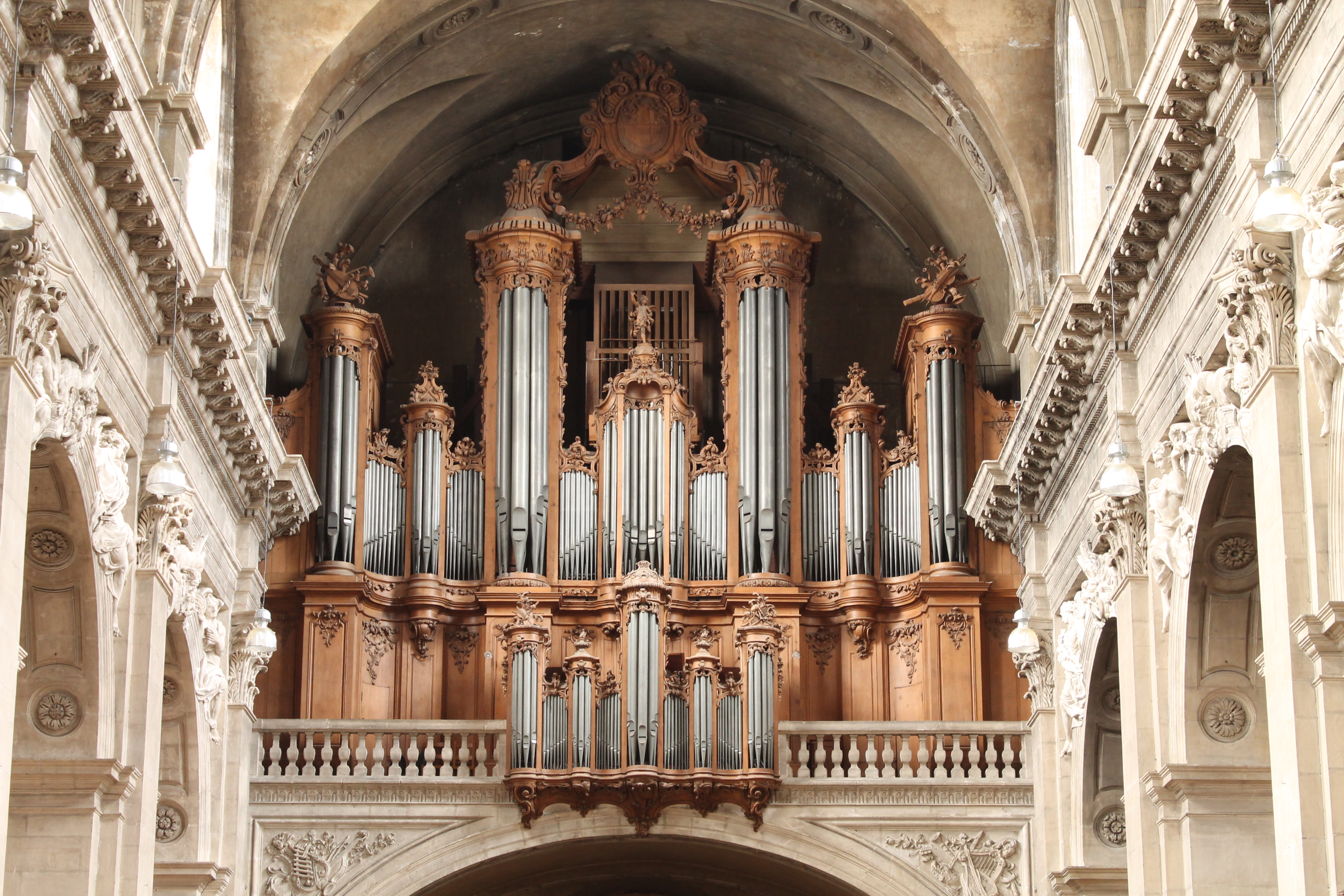
Nancy Cathedral great organ: the case

The great organ of the cathedral of Nancy was begun in 1756. It is placed on a gallery above the central doorway of the Notre-Dame-de-l'Annonciation cathedral in Nancy.

== Dupont - 1763 ==
The great organ was originally built by Nicolas Dupont, the major organ builder in Lorraine during the 18th century, who also famously built the great organs of Toul cathedral and Verdun cathedral, among others. His work at Nancy is his largest. At that time it was the biggest organ in the Duché de Lorraine, a duchy which remained independent from France until 1766. Work began in 1756 and was finished in 1763. At that time, the newly built church was not yet a cathedral but officially a primatiale. The creation of a bigger organ in Nancy (44 stops) compared to the one in the Toul cathedral can be seen as a rivalry between the two cities, as Nancy claimed to become the center of the episcopacy.

The organ's monumental 16-foot case was probably designed by Jean-Nicolas Jennesson and is truly remarkable and typical of its time. Dupont also contributed to its conception as the case can be easily compared to his prior work at Toul cathedral, and was later used as a model for the construction of the Verdun great organ.

The case occupies all the organ gallery's width. A rare elegance, as well as a sumptuous balance, are achieved through the two central 16-foot turrets that surround the convex central turret, overlooked by carved-wood garlands and a central heraldry.

== Vautrin - 1814 ==
Nicolas Dupont looked after the organ until he eventually died in 1781 and the task passed to his pupil Jean-François Vautrin who intervened in 1788 with minor repairs, included adding a stop of grosse caisse (i.e. bass drum).

The French Revolution, starting in 1789, surprisingly did not have any consequence on the instrument thanks to the appointed organist Michelot homme de cœur et de bonté (i.e. kind and heart-full man). He is said to have played Revolutionary anthems, and thus got the great organ saved. Vautrin again repaired the instrument in 1808 : keyboards were extended from D^{5} to F^{5}; 4 stops were added to the Swell, several stops modifications were operated to the Great and Choir; last but not least, two Bombarde stops were added : one of 16’, and one of 32’. It is significant that this was the first Bombarde 32’ stop ever built in France, and it needed some extra modifications to the organ in order to install it.

Unfortunately for Vautrin, he executed all this work without having a written agreement from the cathedral's council, who refused to pay Vautrin in 1814 when he finished it. The lawsuit lasted until 1836, after his death, when an arrangement was found between the council and Vautrin's daughters. Before the case was settled, organ builder Joseph Cuvillier changed the wind supply and the newly French Ministère des Cultes solicited estimates, especially from the Frères Callinet from Rouffach, and from the Frères Claude, a Paris firm, originating in Mirecourt, who eventually were put in charge a minor repairs.

== Cavaillé-Coll - 1861 ==
Minor modifications were made to the great organ after Dupont's original work and it remained a classical 18th-century organ. As the musical standards dramatically changed during the 19th century, famous Parisian organ builder Aristide Cavaillé-Coll, who had just restored the organ of Saint-Sulpice church in Paris, was appointed to reconstruct the organ in a symphonic style.

Cavaillé-Coll retained the case and most of the stops. He migrated the Great reeds stops into a new Bombarde keyboard and created an enclosed-Swell at the center top of the case. He added several other stops to a total of 65, including an identical replacement of the two 16’ and 32’ Vautrin's Bombardes, reconstructed the wind system, the tracker action and the entire console.

Some characteristics of this organ remain unique and reflect Cavaillé-Coll's genius: his specification retains most of the former reed stops. He also added reeds of his own design, making an exceptional total of 23 reeds stops, being 1/3 of the entire organ. Such a proportion remained unique among all his work.

The pedal stops number (15 stops) and the pedal reeds number (8 stops) are the highest ever achieved, beating even bigger constructions, such as Saint-Sulpice or Notre-Dame de Paris. This was Cavaillé-Coll's biggest work in France outside of Paris.

== Haerpfer-Erman - 1965 ==
Aristide Cavaillé-Coll intervened later in 1881 for minor works and in 1921 his successor, Charles Mutin, damage due to shrapnel, as shells had struck the square in front of the cathedral during World War I. In the 1930s, famous organist Marcel Dupré from Saint-Sulpice in Paris supervised a transmission electrification project that organ builder Roethinger from Strasbourg was supposed to carry out. This project was fortunately stopped just because of World War II. It is thought that the work would have irrevocably modified the specification and the sound; it would have destroyed the whole action and console.

Finally, in 1965, a complete restoration was urgently needed, and organ builder Hærpfer-Erman was designated. The restoration was supervised by famous organist Gaston Litaize and transformed the instrument's specification according to the néo-classique ideas that were in vogue after World War II. The wind system, action, console and wind chests were mostly kept unspoilt, but the stop specifications were modified and pipes were re-voiced. Some characteristic stops from the romantic organ's period such as harmonic stops, several viola da gamba, and several 16’ stops were replaced by smaller ones such as mixtures and mutation stops, corresponding to the classical French organ style. As was customary after World War II, materials used were of poor quality, especially regarding the organ's historical content.

On the Positif; the Gambe 8, Flûte Harmonique 8 and Dulciane 4 were removed; the Plein-Jeu VII was broken up to form a Fourniture IV, Nasard 2 2/3, Larigot 1 1/3 and a new Tierce 1 3/5 rank.

On the Grand-Orgue; the Gambe 16, Flûte Conique 16, Gambe 8, Flautone 8 and Viole 4 were replaced by a Tierce 3 1/5, Dessus de Septième 1 1/7, and the Quinte 2 2/3 and Doublette 2 from the Bombarde.

On the Bombarde; the Plein-Jeu IX was broken up into a Fourniture V and Cymbale IV, the Basson 16 was removed and the Quinte 2 2/3 and Doublette 2 were moved to the Grand-Orgue, and their places were taken by Principals 8, 4 and 2.

On the Récit; the Flûte Harmonique 8 was removed and replaced by a Principal 8, and a Cornet V and Plein-Jeu IV were added.

On the Pédale; the only change was the replacement of the Violoncello 8 by a Fourniture IV.

== The organ today ==
Recent work (2012) has occurred in the organ, led by organ builders Laurent Plet and Bertrand Cattiaux; it consisted of dust removal, mechanics and wind review, re-voicing of the Choir and restoration of its reeds stops. If today's organ specification slightly more reflects the néo-classique aesthetics because of the 1965 Hærpfer-Erman's modifications, the organ's sound still keeps a deep influence from Cavaillé-Coll. It still remains 24 stops (37% of total) from Dupont, 23 (35%) from Cavaillé-Coll and 2 from Vautrin. Sixteen stops have been replaced, but recently several flutes stops have been made harmonic again and the Choir's reeds have been re-voiced (2012). The Pedal and the extraordinary Swell have been kept nearly unmodified since 1965 and contribute to a still indisputable symphonic sound.

The case has been classified as a French Monument Historique on August 9, 1906, the instrument part has also been classified on September 22, 2003.

Piotr Grabowski turned it into a virtual pipe organ for Hauptwerk and GrandOrgue software, and was released on 29 May 2021.

From 2021 to 2024, the organ will be restored by the Chevron-Cattiaux workshop, Michel Jurine and Christian Guerrier. The organ will be returned to the condition of 1861 after the Cavaillé-Coll rebuild, and as of October 2021, the organ will be disassembled imminently.

== Disposition ==
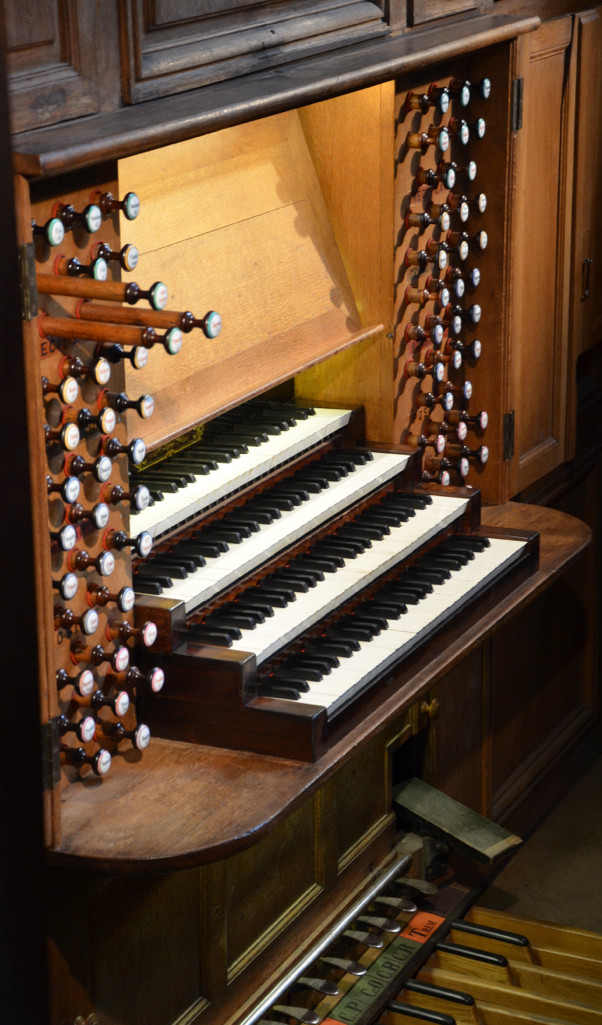
Console of the great organ of Nancy cathedral

I Positif
Montre	8’
Bourdon	8’
Prestant	4’
Nazard	2' ^{2/3}
Doublette	2'
Tierce	1' ^{3/5}
Larigot	1' ^{1/3}
Piccolo	1’
Cornet	5 rgs
Fourniture	4 rgs
Trompette	8’
Clairon	4’
Basson-hautbois	8’
Cromorne	8’

II Grand-Orgue
Montre	16’
Bourdon	16’
Montre	8’
Flûte harmonique	8’
Bourdon	8’
Prestant	4’
Flûte douce	4’
Grosse tierce	3' ^{1/5}
Quinte	2' ^{2/3}
Doublette	2’
Dessus de Septième	1' ^{1/7}

III Bombarde
Principal	8'
Principal	4’
Principal	2’
Cornet	5 rgs
Fourniture	5 rgs
Cymbale	4 rgs
Bombarde	16’
1^{ère} trompette	8’
2^{ème} trompette	8’
Clairon	4’
Cromorne	8’

IV Récit expressif
Quintaton	16’
Principal	8’
Bourdon	8’
Gambe	8’
Voix céleste	8’
Flûte octaviante	4’
Octavin	2’
Cornet	5 rgs
Plein-jeu	4 rgs
Basson	16’
Trompette	8’
Clairon	4’
Basson-hautbois	8’
Voix humaine	8’

Pédale
Soubasse	32’
Flûte	16’
Contrebasse	16’
Soubasse	16’
Flûte	8’
Flûte	4’
Mixture	4 rgs
Contre-bombarde	32’
Bombarde	16’
Bombarde	16’
Contre-basson	16’
Trompette	8’
Basson	8’
Clairon	4’
Baryton	4’

Couplers

I/II, III/II, IV/II
Tirasses I, II, IV
Introduction II
Appel anches I, IV
Appel anches 32'
Appel anches Pédale
Tremblant I
Trémolo IV
Expression IV

Tracker action for manuals (with Barker machine for Great and couplers), pedal and stops.

== Organists ==
- Johann Vexo since 2009
- Guillaume Beaudoin since 2014
