= Maurice Ravel Auditorium =

- Interactive map of the Maurice Ravel Auditorium area
- Etymology: Maurice Ravel

General information
- Status: Completed
- Type: Concert Hall
- Architectural style: Brutalist
- Location: 149 rue Garibaldi, Lyon, France
- Coordinates: 45°45′41.80″N 4°51′9.91″E
- Inaugurated: February 14th, 1975

Technical details
- Material: Prestressed concrete & Steel

Design and construction
- Architects: Charles Delfante & Henry Pottier

Other information
- Seating capacity: 2,100
- Parking: Yes

Website
- http://www.auditorium-lyon.com

References
- http://www.auditorium-lyon.com/Le-lieu/L-Auditorium

The Maurice Ravel Auditorium is a concert hall located in Part-Dieu, the 3rd district of Lyon. It was originally built for the National Orchestra of Lyon and is their residence hall. It is also one of the first buildings in France to be built with prestressed concrete.

== Acoustics ==
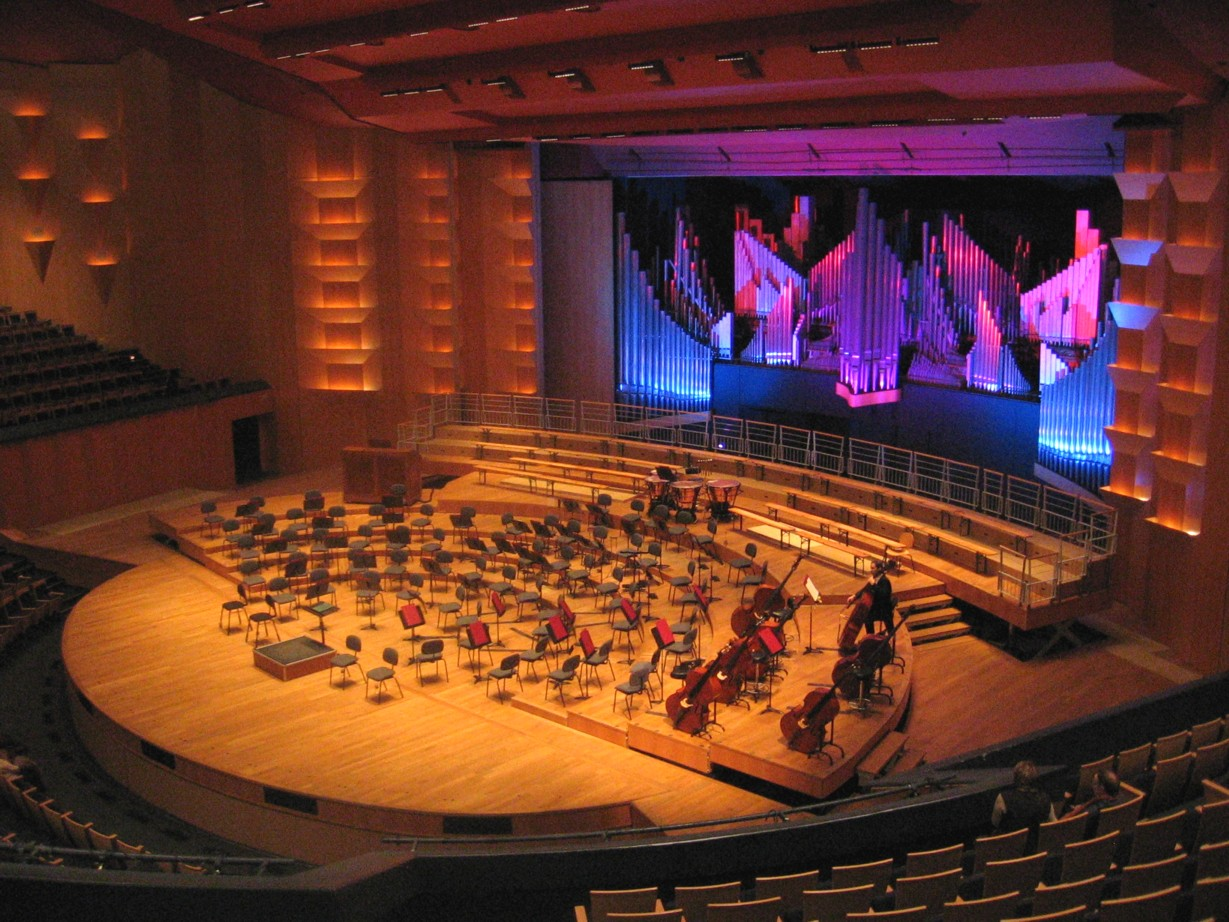
Auditorium interior

The building was built without an acoustic study which resulted in the volume being too low for symphonic purposes, with a reflective concave back wall. The stage had no lateral walls, which resulted in the musicians struggling to hear one another. The wall was eventually treated to prevent strong echoes. Eventually a Phillips acoustic enhancement system was fitted to help with sound coverage and reverberation.

== The organ ==
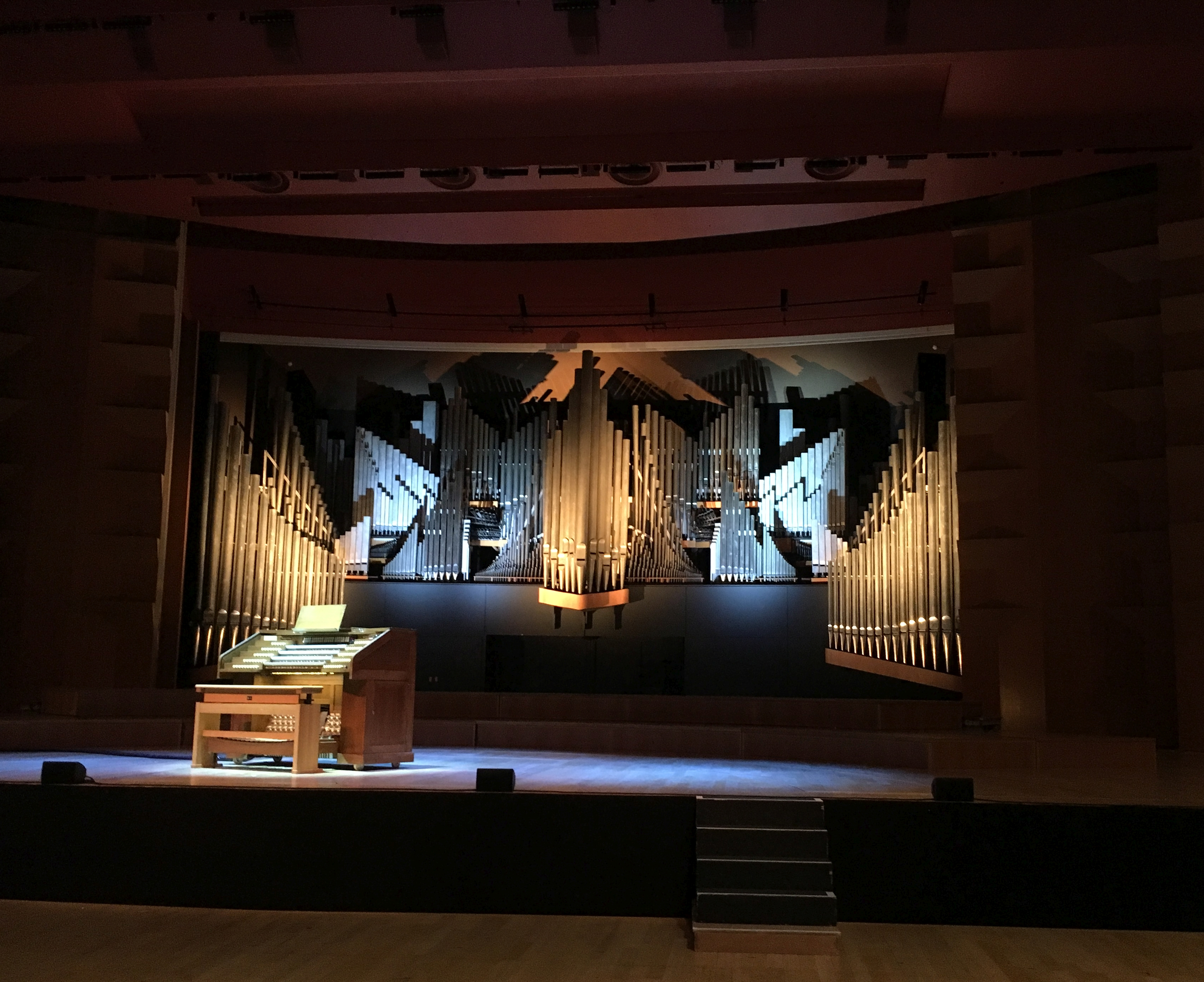
The organ

In 1878 the renowned French organ builder, Aristide Cavaillé-Coll, was commissioned to build a concert organ for the Trocadéro concert hall, under the supervision of renowned organist and composer Alexandre Guilmant. Because of the time constraints of the contract he did not have time to build one from scratch and had to use an uncompleted three-manual organ originally intended for the Church of Notre Dame in Auteuil, a district in the northwestern area of Paris, as the basis for the new instrument.

The organ moved to the Palais de Chaillot when the Trocadéro was demolished and was ultimately bought by the government of Lyon for the Auditorium.

== See also ==
- List of Brutalist structures
