= Centre Charras =

Entertainment district in Courbevoie, France

Coordinates: 48°53′42.9″N 2°15′09.8″E

- Interactive map of Centre Charras
- Full name: Complexe Urbain Charras; Zodiaque
- Location: Courbevoie, France
- Public transit: Place Charras; 275 278; Courbevoie

Construction
- Opened: 1969 (shopping center)
- Years active: 1969–present
- Architect: Henry Pottier
- Builders: Union des Assurances de Paris; Office public de l'habitat de Courbevoie
- Structural engineer: Patrick Le Lay
- Main contractor: Entreprise Oger

Complexe Urbain Charras, promoted in real estate as Zodiaque and commonly called Centre Charras, is a former military garrison site and current residential and entertainment district in Courbevoie, Hauts-de-Seine, France.

== Caserne Charras ==
Caserne Charras was one of three identical barracks built for the Swiss Guards in 1756, along with those in Saint-Denis and Rueil-Malmaison (the only one still standing). It later became home to a succession of French Army garrisons. In 1886, it was renamed in honor of former Minister of War Jean-Baptiste-Adolphe Charras, a Republican and exiled opponent of Napoleon III. It housed the École des officiers de la gendarmerie nationale for a short period between mid-1943 and late 1945. In 1961, the barracks was decommissioned and bought by the city of Courbevoie for demolition. Only its front wall has been preserved, and moved to Parc de Bécon, a public park on the banks of the river Seine.

== Zodiaque ==
On the land formerly occupied by the barracks, architect Henry Pottier was commissioned to build a large ensemble consisting of several residential buildings arranged around an elevated square (Place Charles de Gaulle), under which are located a shopping center, a multistorey car park and public sports facilities. As reflected by its name, the ensemble has an astrological theme, and the architecture of its main residential buildings is loosely inspired by signs of the zodiac.

=== Residential buildings ===
- Poissons (English: Pisces), a skyscraper designed to look like two imbricated towers, one with 42 floors, the other with 35 floors. Upon completion, it comprised 299 housing units, a medical center and 8000 m^{2} of office space. It briefly was France's tallest occupiable building before the opening of Tour Montparnasse in 1973.
- Gémeaux (English: Gemini), a 25-floor apartment block with 455 housing units.
- Verseaux (English: Aquarius), a 9-floor building featuring 149 housing units.
- Bélier (English: Taurus), an 18-floor tower with 125 apartments.
- Sagittaire (English: Sagittarius), a 9-floor apartment block with 88 housing units and retail space on the bottom floor.
- Capricorne (English: Capricorn), a 9-floor, 120-apartment building. Together with Bélier and Sagittaire, it is located on the north side of rue de l'Alma, while the rest of the complex is located to the south. Originally, Capricorne was going to extend above rue de l'Alma and bridge both sides, but the idea was abandoned and the building scaled back.

In 1977, the complex was extended with Balance (English: Libra), an 8 to 13 floor slanted roof building containing 126 units. It was built together with a series of towers that stretches to the east of rue de l'Alma. While they are all architecturally similar, only Balance is part of the Zodiaque ensemble. The other towers form a different complex called Les Mousquetaires (English: The Musketeers), which is divided into four residences, each consisting of one or two towers: Athos, Porthos, Aramis and d'Artagnan.

Thierry Monier Ice Rink
- Patinoire Thierry-Monier
- Interactive map of Thierry Monier Ice Rink
- Former names: Patinoire municipale de Courbevoie
- Capacity: 1019 (seated); 1557 (total)
- Field size: 56 × 26 metre

Construction
- Opened: 1972

Tenant
- Coqs de Courbevoie (1972–present)

=== Sports and leisure ===
Piscine olympique de Courbevoie
- Interactive map of Piscine olympique de Courbevoie
- Type: Indoor
- Facilities: Sauna
- Dimensions: Length: 50 metre (pool 1) 20 metre (pool 2); Width: 25 metre (pool 1) 15,5 metre (pool 2)

Construction
- Opened: 1972

- An ice rink featuring a 56 × 26 metre track. It was renamed in honor of Thierry Monier, the longtime coach of local ice hockey team Coqs de Courbevoie, after his death in 2007. It has received poor reviews due to its obstructed views.
- A swimming pool featuring an 8-lane, 50-metre main pool and a 5-lane, 25-metre second pool. It is home to Stade Français Olympique Courbevoie, the swimming section of storied multisports club Stade Français.
- A 12-lane bowling center. It is home to the Bowling club olympique de Courbevoie.

An athletics track was also considered for the southern end of the complex, but it was replaced by a terrace featuring a 200 m^{2} paddling pool and two outdoor volleyball courts.

=== Shopping and hospitality ===
- Centre Commercial Charras, an indoor shopping center located below Place Charles de Gaulle, featuring a Carrefour supermarket and space for 80 shops. However, the building's age and outdated configuration have caused its occupancy rate to fall in the 2000s.
- Hôtel Mercure Paris La Défense, a 507-room hotel operated by Accor under its Mercure brand as of 2022.
- 1800 parking spaces

In 2021, a 2400 m^{2} indoor market called Marché Charras was built on the public square bordering Résidence Balance. Designed by the Croixmarie Bourdon agency, it adds another 600 parking spaces below the retail floor, while its slanted roof is intended to align with Balance's silhouette when looked at from certain angles.

=== Education and culture ===
- A day care center with room for 60 children
- A kindergarten, École maternelle Saint-Exupéry
- 14 artist workshops located on Place Charles de Gaulle
