= Aristide Cavaillé-Coll =

French organ builder (1811–1899)

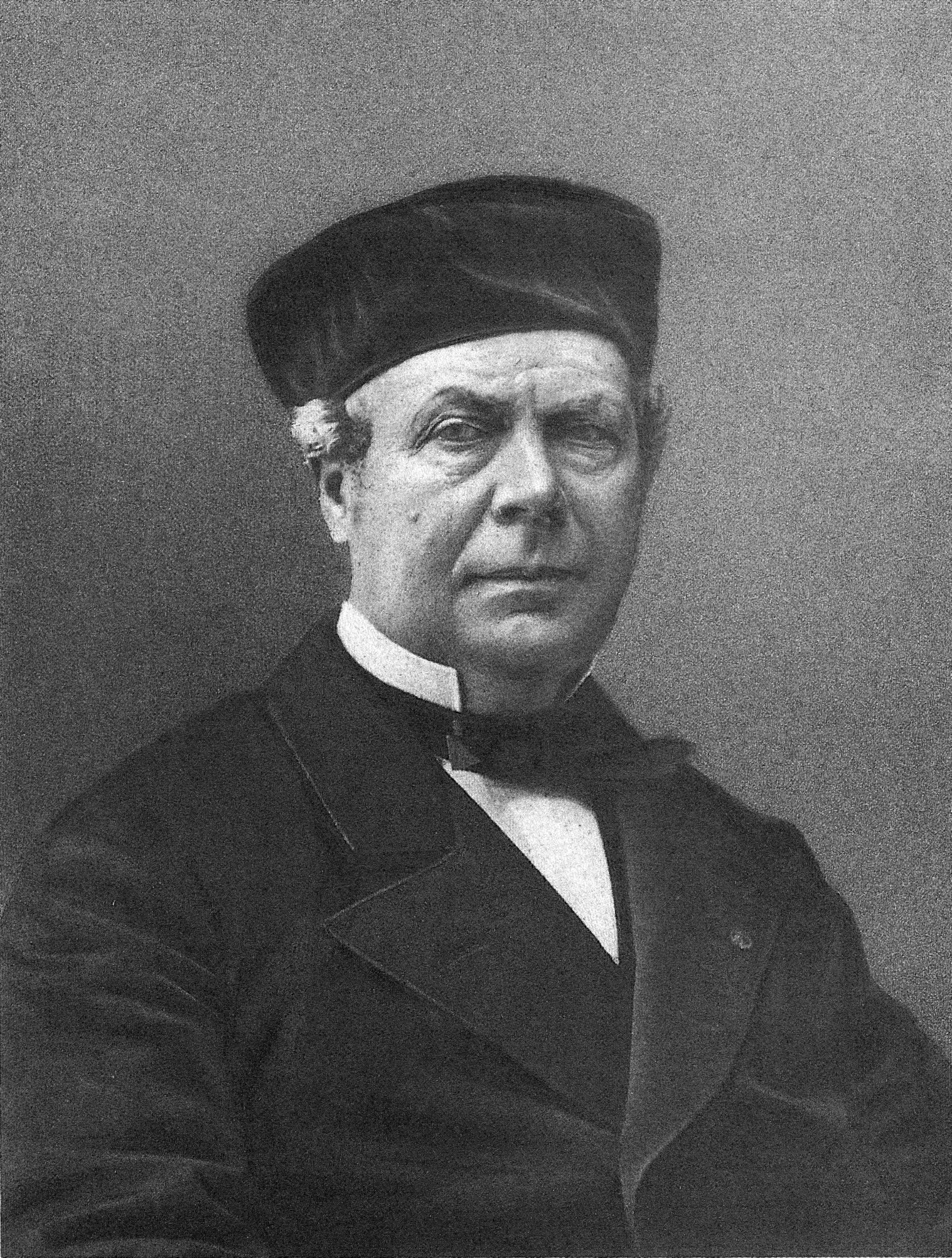
- Born: 4 February 1811; Montpellier, France
- Died: 13 October 1899 (aged 88); Paris, France

Aristide Cavaillé-Coll (French: [aʁistid kavaje kɔl]; 4 February 1811 – 13 October 1899) was a French organ builder. He has the reputation of being the most distinguished organ builder of the 19th century. He pioneered innovations in the art and science of organ building that permeated the profession and influenced the course of organ building, composing and improvising through the early 20th century.

As the author of scientific journal articles about the organ construction details, he published the results of his research and experiments.

He was the inventor of the symphonic organ being able to follow smooth and immediate dynamic changes like a symphonic orchestra.

His most famous organs were built in Paris in Saint-Denis Basilica (1841), Église de la Madeleine, Sainte-Clotilde Basilica (1859), Saint-Sulpice church (his largest instrument; behind the classical façade), Notre-Dame Cathedral (behind the classical façade), baron Albert de L'Espée's residence in Biarritz (moved finally to the Sacré-Cœur Basilica), and many others. The organ reform movement in the 20th century sought to return organ building to a more Baroque style; but since then, Cavaillé-Coll's designs have come back into fashion.

== Life ==
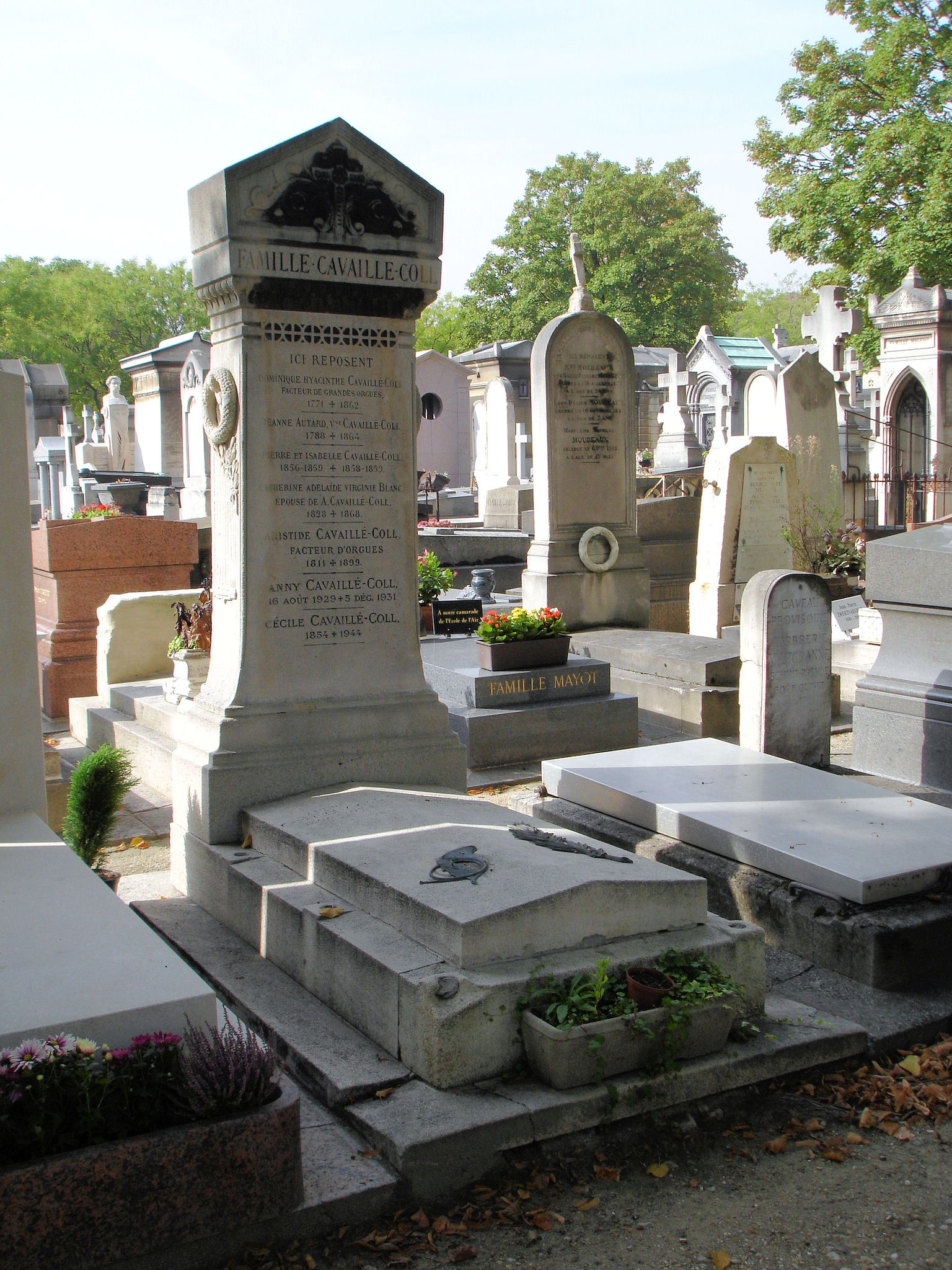
Cavaillé-Coll's grave in Montparnasse Cemetery, Paris

Born in Montpellier, France, to Dominique, one in a line of organ builders, he showed early talent in mechanical innovation. He exhibited an outstanding fine art when designing and building his famous instruments. His organs are "symphonic organs": they can reproduce the sounds of other instruments and combine them as well.

Cavaillé-Coll was also known for his financial problems - he focused mostly on the organ building art, leaving finance less attention. The art of his handcrafted instruments, unparalleled at that time, was not enough to ensure his firm's survival. It was taken over in 1898, shortly before his death, by Charles Mutin, who continued in the organ business, but by the 1940s the firm had almost disappeared.

Cavaillé-Coll died in Paris on 13 October 1899 and is buried in the Montparnasse Cemetery.

== Organ building innovations ==
Cavaillé-Coll is responsible for many innovations that revolutionized organ building, performance and composition. Instead of the Positif, Cavaillé-Coll placed the Grand-Orgue manual as the lowest manual, and included couplers that allowed the entire tonal resources of the organ to be played from the Grand-Orgue. He refined the English swell box by devising a spring-loaded (later balanced) pedal with which the organist could operate the swell shutters, thus increasing the organ's potential for expression.

He adjusted pipe making and voicing techniques, thus creating a whole family of harmonic stops (flutes, trompettes, clairons) and stops imitating orchestral instruments such as the bassoon, the oboe and the english horn. He popularized the harmonic flute stop, which, together with the montre (principals), the gambe (strings) and the bourdon (flutes), formed the fonds (foundations) of the organ. He designed the "orchestral quartet" which referred to orchestral four colours of sound - principals, flutes, strings and reeds.

He introduced divided windchests which were controlled by ventils. These allowed the use of higher wind pressures and for each manual's anches (reed stops) to be added or subtracted as a group by means of a pedal. Higher wind pressures allowed the organ to include many more stops of 8' (unison) pitch in every division, so complete fonds as well as reed choruses could be placed in every division, designed to be superimposed on top of one another. Sometimes he placed the treble part of the compass on a higher pressure than the bass, to emphasize melody lines and counteract the natural tendency of small pipes (especially reeds) to be softer.

It is he [Cavaillé-Coll] who conceived the diverse wind pressures, the divided windchests, the pedal systems and the combination registers; he who applied for the first time Barker's pneumatic motors, created the family of harmonic stops, reformed and perfected the mechanics to such a point that each pipe—low or high, loud or soft—instantly obeys the touch of the finger… From this result: the possibility of confining an entire division in a sonorous prison—opened or closed at will—the freedom of mixing timbres, the means of intensifying them or gradually tempering them, the freedom of tempos, the sureness of attacks, the balance of contrasts, and, finally, a whole blossoming of wonderful colors—a rich palette of the most diverse shades: harmonic flutes, gambas, bassoons, English horns, trumpets, celestes, flue stops and reed stops of a quality and variety unknown before.

— Charles-Marie Widor, Avant-propos to the organ symphonies, tr. John Near

For a mechanical tracker action and its couplers to operate under these higher wind pressures, pneumatic assistance provided by the Barker lever was required, which Cavaillé-Coll included in his larger instruments. This device made it possible to couple all the manuals together and play on the full organ without expending a great deal of effort.

He also invented the pneumatic combination action system for his five-manual organ at Église Saint-Sulpice, Paris.

All these innovations allowed a seamless crescendo from pianissimo all the way to fortissimo, something never before possible on the organ. His organ at the Basilique Ste-Clotilde, Paris (proclaimed a basilica by Pope Leo XIII in 1897) was one of the first to be built with several of these new features. Consequently, it influenced César Franck, who was the titular organist there. The organ works of Franck have inspired generations of organist-composers who came after him.

== Legacy ==
Featuring 102 stops and five manuals, the Saint-Sulpice instrument, which unlike many others remains practically unaltered, is a candidate to become a UNESCO World Heritage Site.

Marcel Dupré stated that "composing for an orchestra is quite different from composing for an organ... with exception of Master Cavaillé-Coll's symphonic organs: in that case one has to observe an extreme attention when writing for such kind of instruments."

Almost a century beforehand, César Franck had ecstatically said of the modest Cavaillé-Coll instrument at l'Église St.-Jean-St.-François in Paris with words that summed up everything the builder was trying to do: "Mon nouvel orgue ? C'est un orchestre !" ("My new organ? It's an orchestra!").

Franck later became organist of a much larger Cavaillé-Coll organ at St Clotilde in Paris. In 1878 Franck was featured recitalist on the four-manual Cavaillé-Coll organ at the Palais du Trocadéro in Paris; this organ was subsequently rebuilt by V. & F. Gonzalez in 1939 and reinstalled in the Palais de Chaillot which replaced the Palais de Trocadéro, then rebuilt in 1975 by Gonzalez-Danion and relocated to the Auditorium Maurice Ravel in Lyon. Franck's Trois Pièces were premiered on the Trocadéro organ.

== Film ==
A documentary film titled The Genius of Cavaillé-Coll was released in 2012 by Fugue State Films to mark both the 200th anniversary of Cavaillé-Coll's birth in 2011 and the 150th anniversary of his organ at St Sulpice. It won the DVD Documentary Award of the BBC Music Awards 2014.

== Existing Cavaillé-Coll organs ==
=== In Europe ===
==== In France ====
- Bergerac: Saint Jacques
- Bonsecours: Basilique Notre-Dame
- Caen: Abbey of Saint-Étienne (50 stops, 3 manuals)
- Carcassonne: Cathedral
- Castelnau-d'Estrétefonds: Saint-Martin
- Dinan: Basilica of Saint-Sauveur
- Dreux: Chapelle royale
- Épernay: Saint-Pierre Saint-Paul
- Lavaur: Cathedral
- Lisieux: Lisieux Cathedral
- Luçon: Cathedral
- Lyon: Saint-François-de-Sales
- Orléans: Cathedral
- Mazamet: Saint-Sauveur
- Nancy: Cathedral (65 stops, 4 manuals)
- Paris: American Cathedral (72 stops, 4 manuals)
- Paris: Saint-Roch
- Paris: La Madeleine (58 stops, 3 manuals)
- Paris: Notre-Dame-de-la-Croix (26 stops, 2 manuals)
- Paris: Notre Dame
- Paris: Notre-Dame-de-l'Assomption
- Paris: Pentemont Abbey
- Paris: Saint-Antoine-des-Quinze-Vingts
- Paris: Sainte-Clotilde Basilica (71 stops, 3 manuals)
- Paris: Saint-Sulpice (102 stops, 5 manuals)
- Paris: Saint-Vincent-de-Paul (66 stops, 3 manuals)
- Paris: Sainte-Trinité (61 stops, 3 manuals)
- Paris: Saint-Jean-de-Montmartre (28 stops, 2 manuals)
- Paris: Sacré-Cœur (78 stops, 4 manuals)
- Paris: Val-de-Grâce
- Courbevoie (near Paris): Saint-Maurice de Bécon
- Perpignan: Cathedral
- Rabastens: Notre-Dame-du-Bourg Church (smallest, with only 20 stops)
- Rouen: Church of St. Ouen. (64 stops, 4 manuals)
- Saint-Denis: Basilica (47 stops, 4 manuals)
- Saint-Germain-en-Laye: Saint-Germain church
- Saint-Omer: Cathedral (49 stops, 4 manuals)
- Saint-Yrieix-la-Perche: Collégiale du Moustier
- Toulouse: Saint-Sernin Basilica (51 stops, 3 manuals)
- Trouville-sur-Mer: Notre-Dame des Victoires
- Vimoutiers: Notre-Dame
- Yport: Eglise saint-Martin
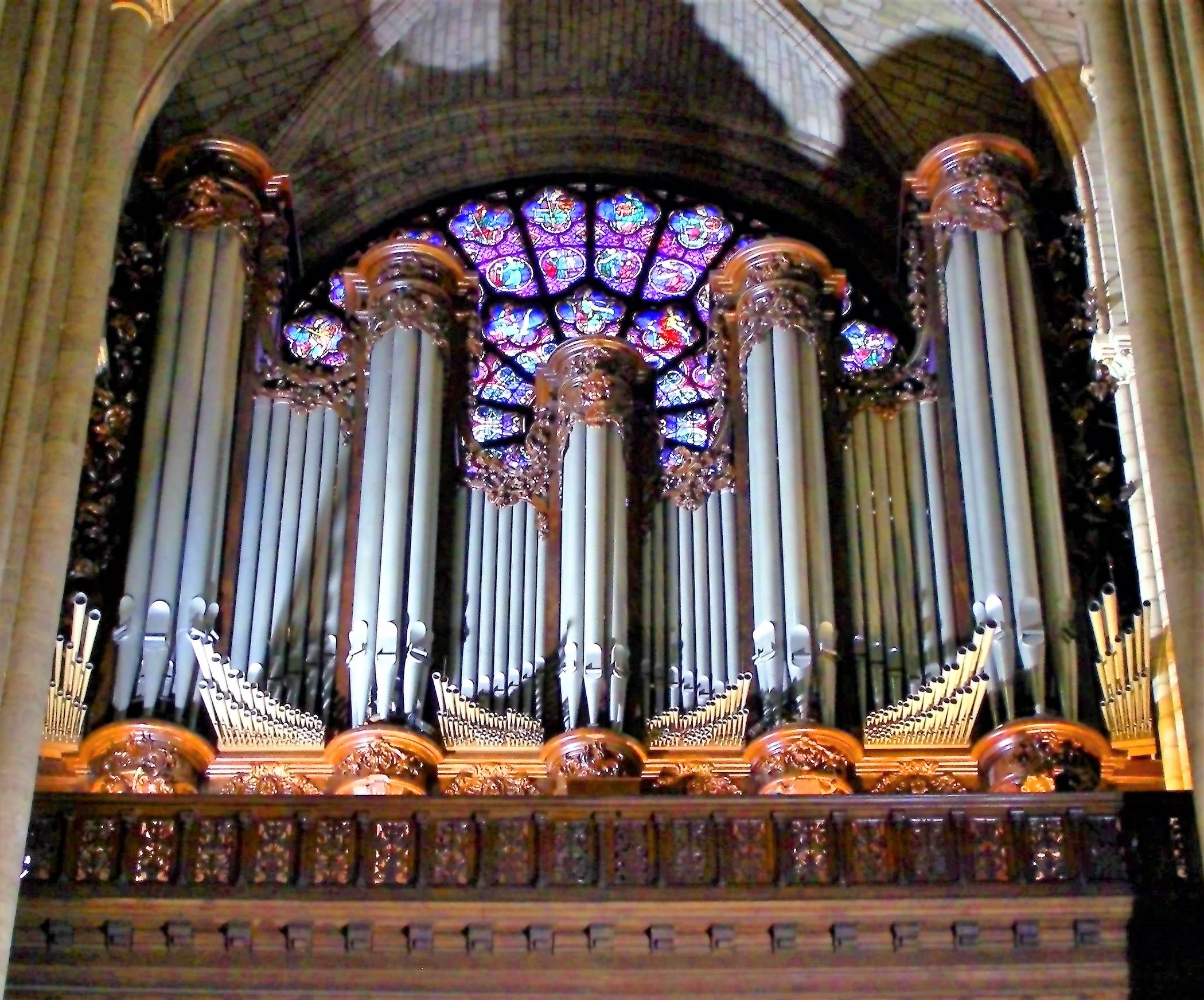
Notre Dame de Paris

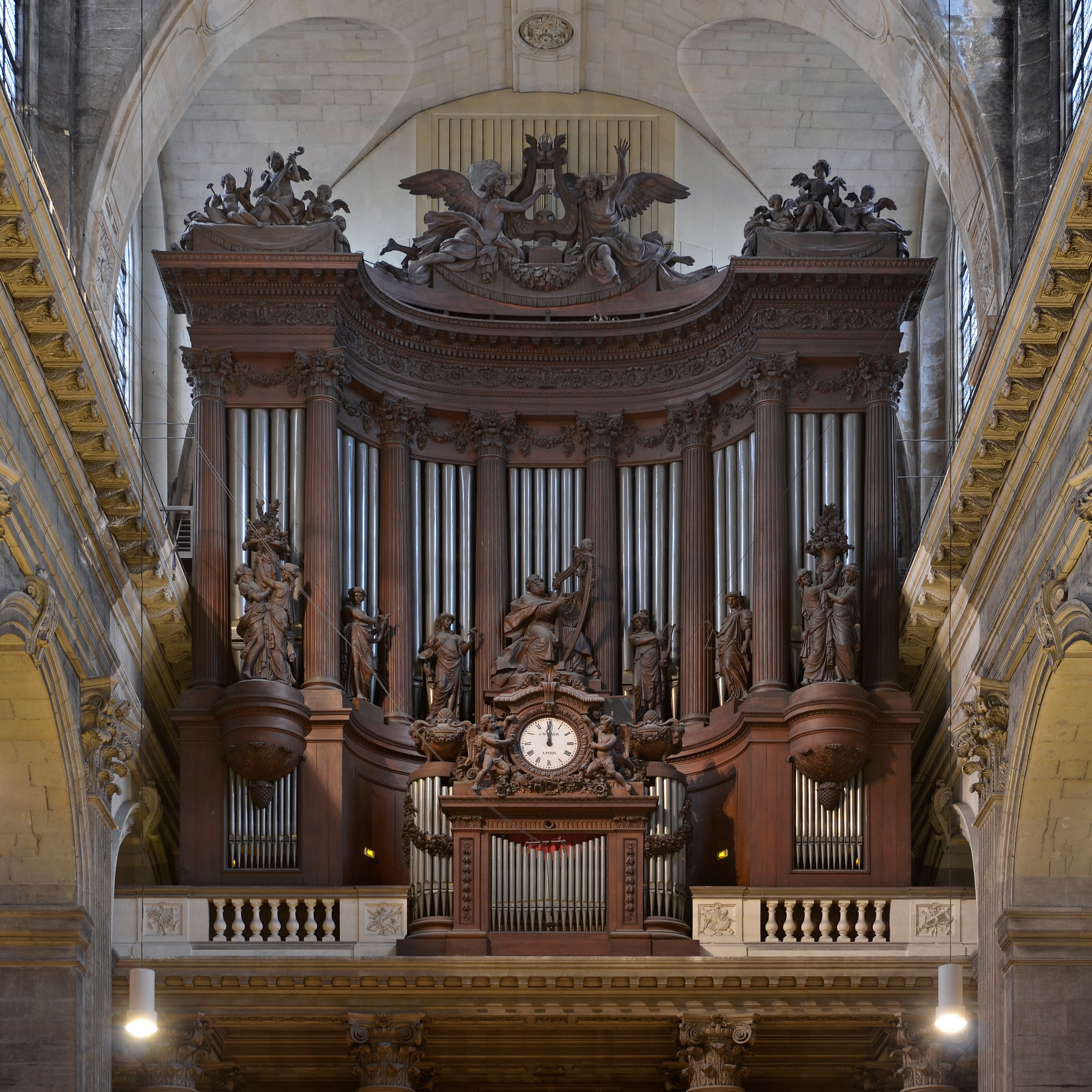
Saint Sulpice

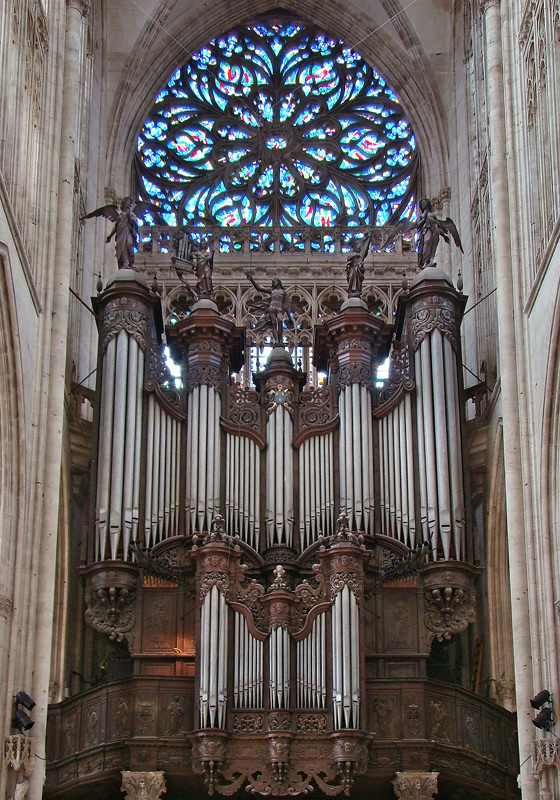
Church of Saint Ouen, Rouen

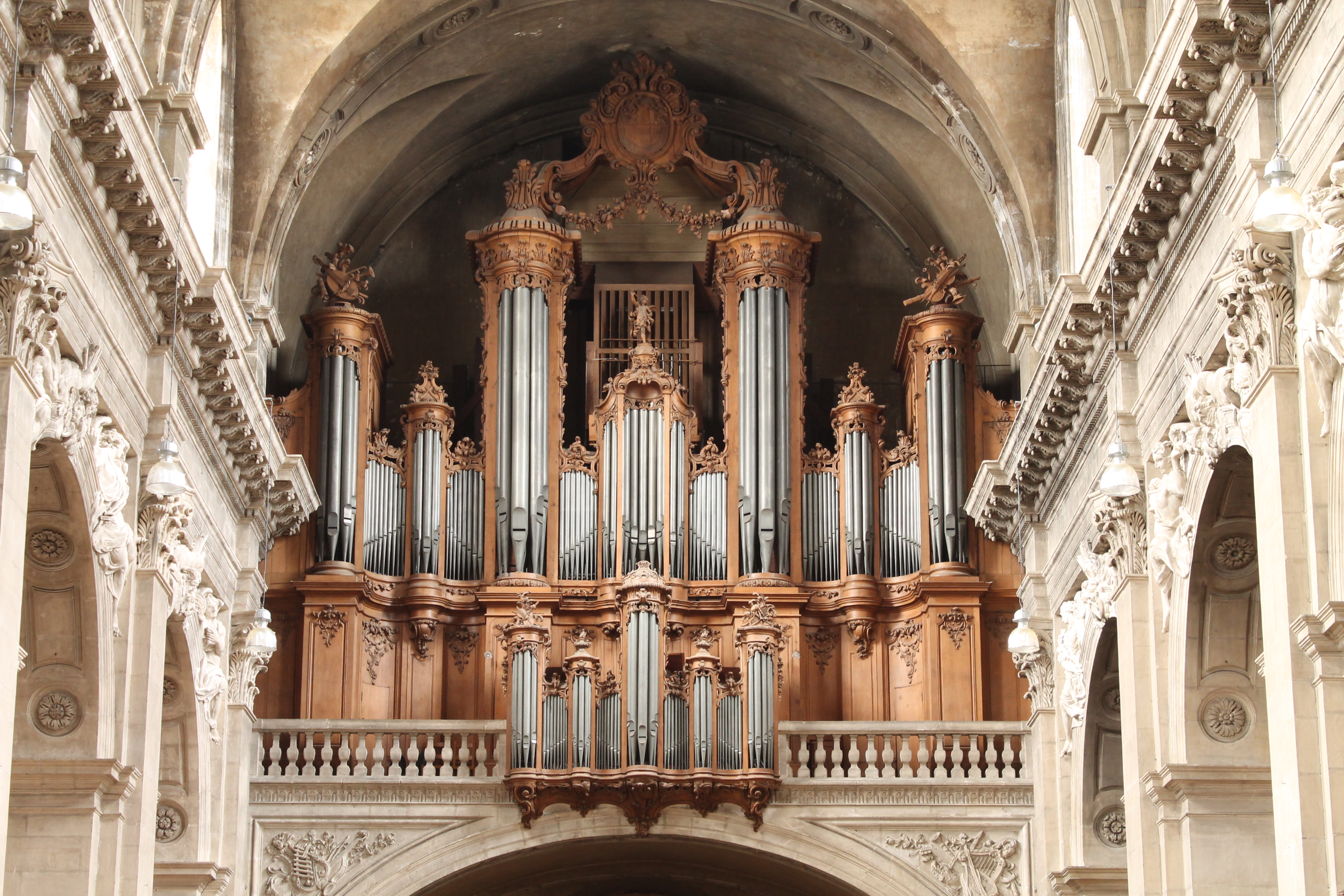
Nancy Cathedral

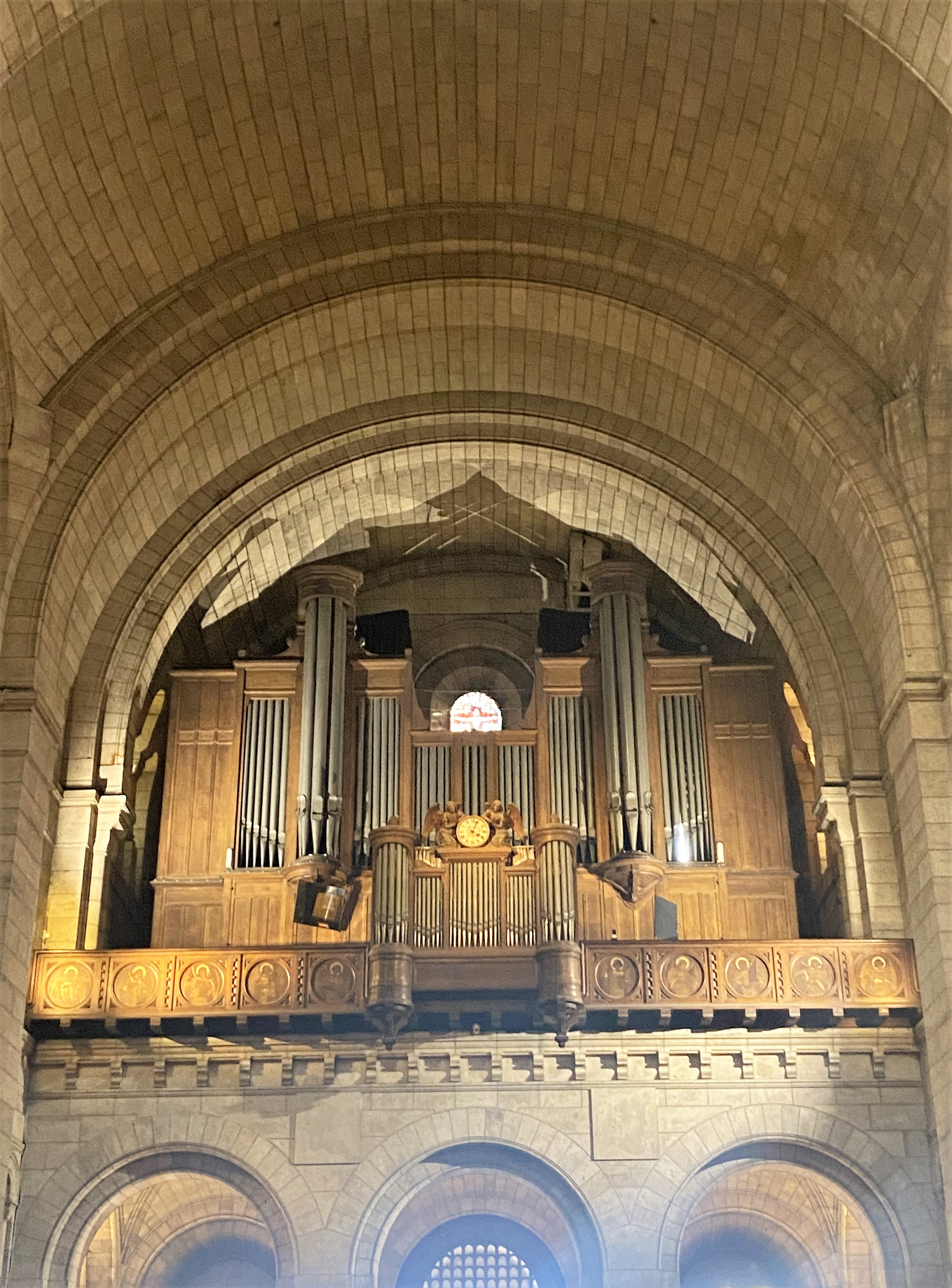
Sacré cœur

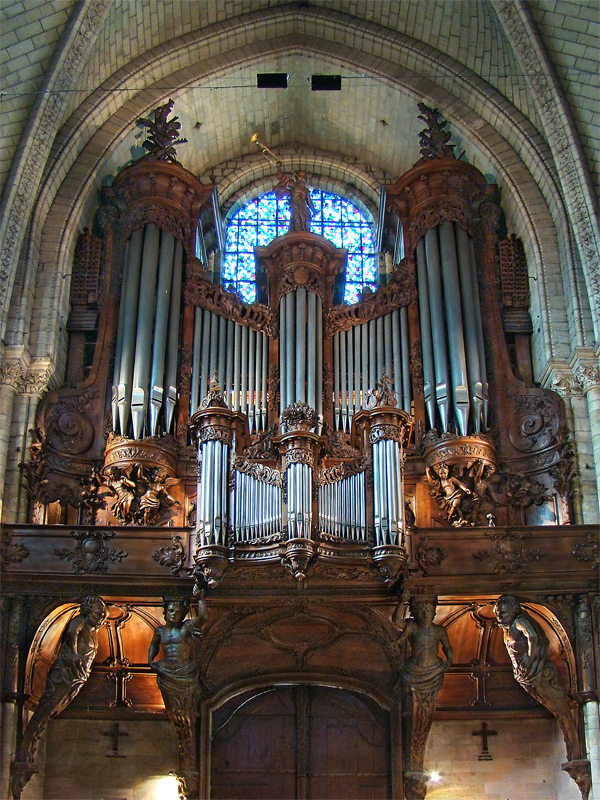
Angers Cathedral

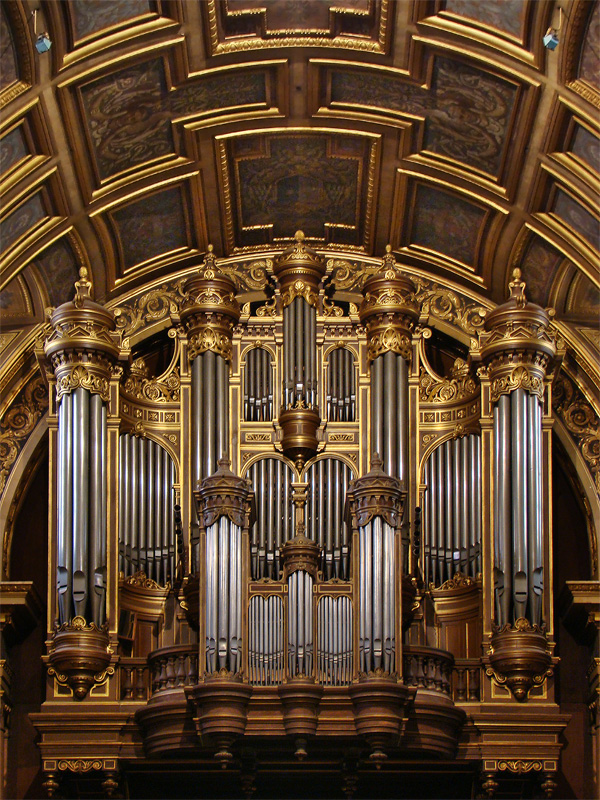
Rennes Cathedral

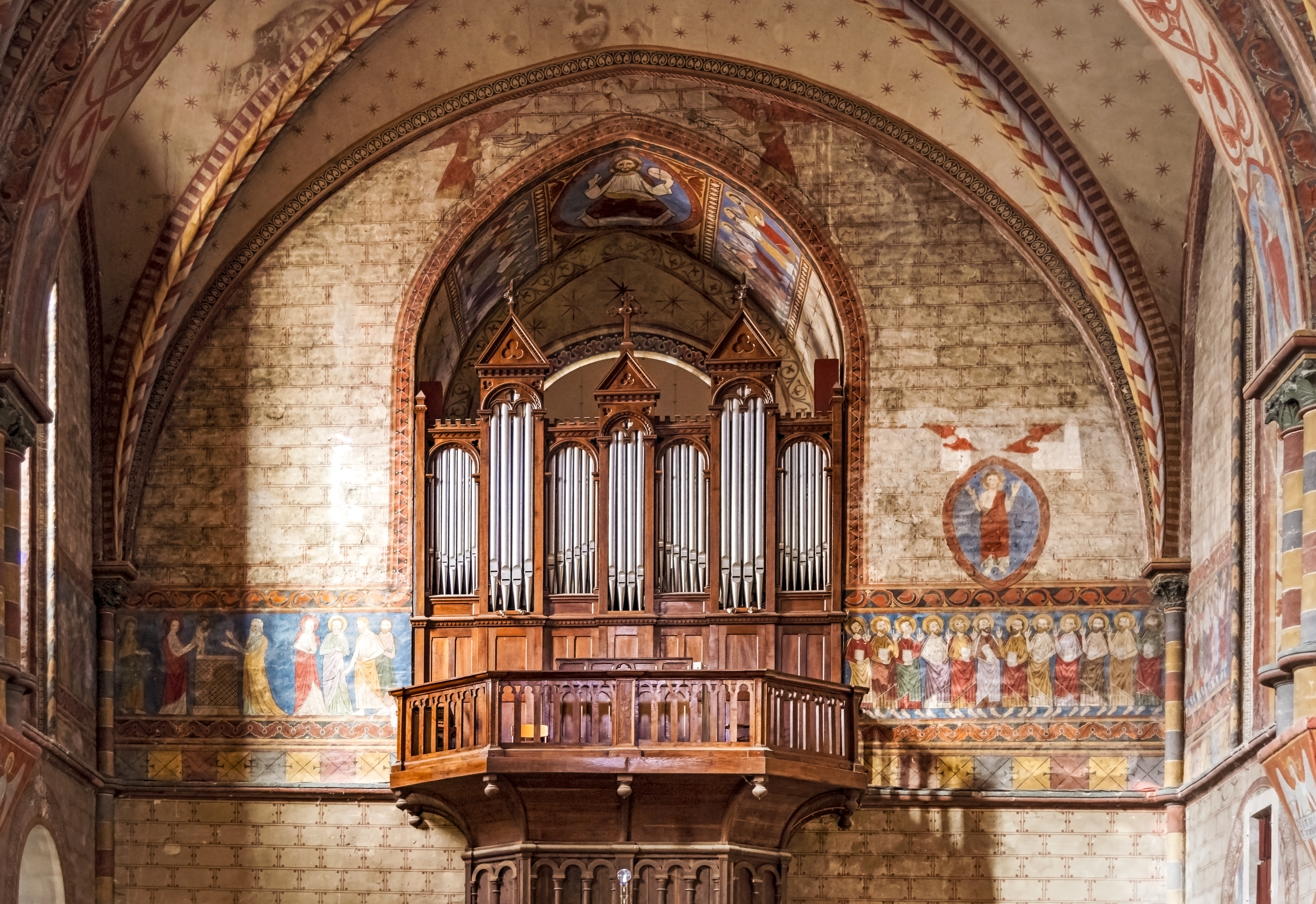
Notre-Dame-du-Bourg Rabastens

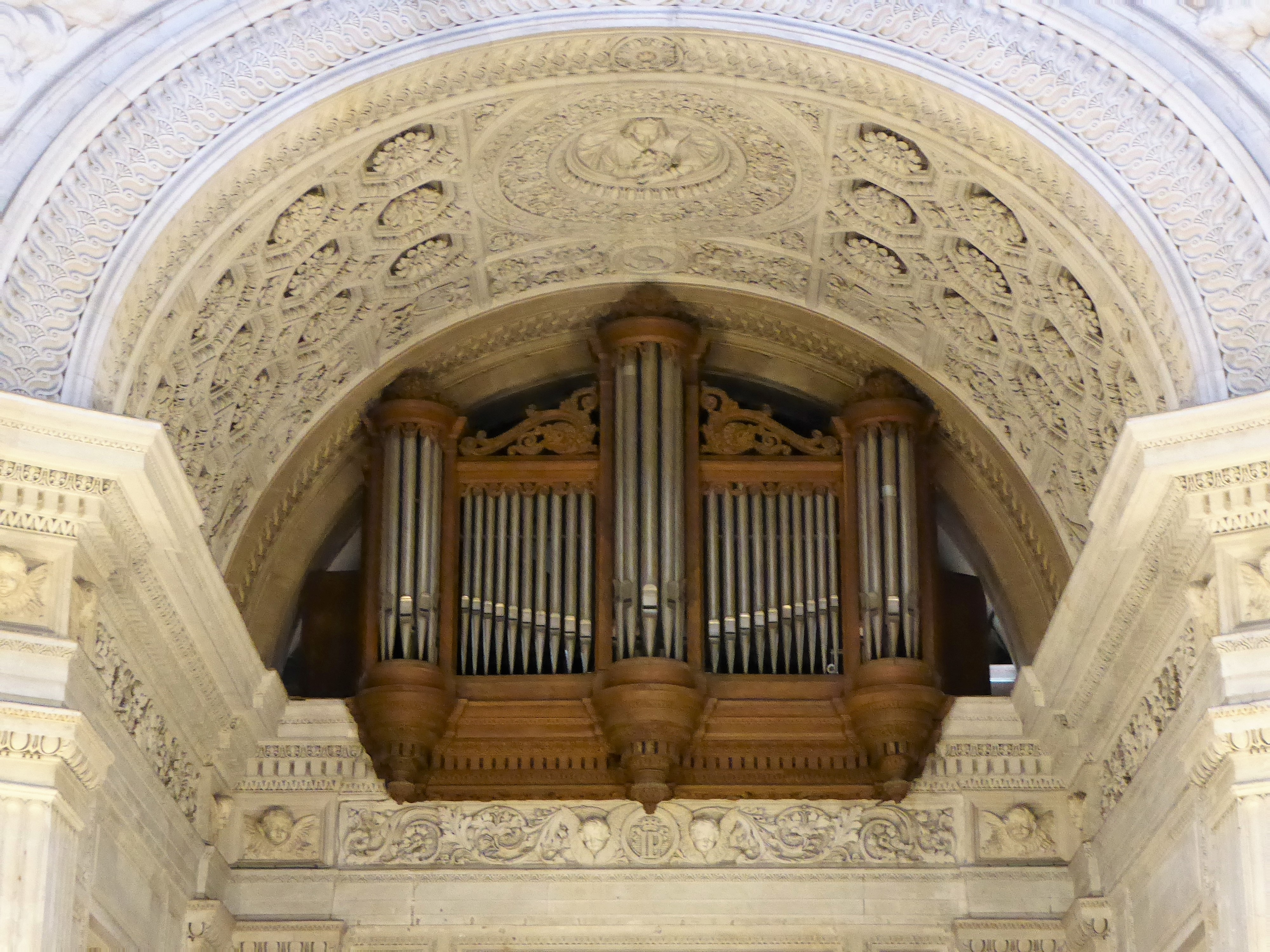
Chapelle royale de Dreux

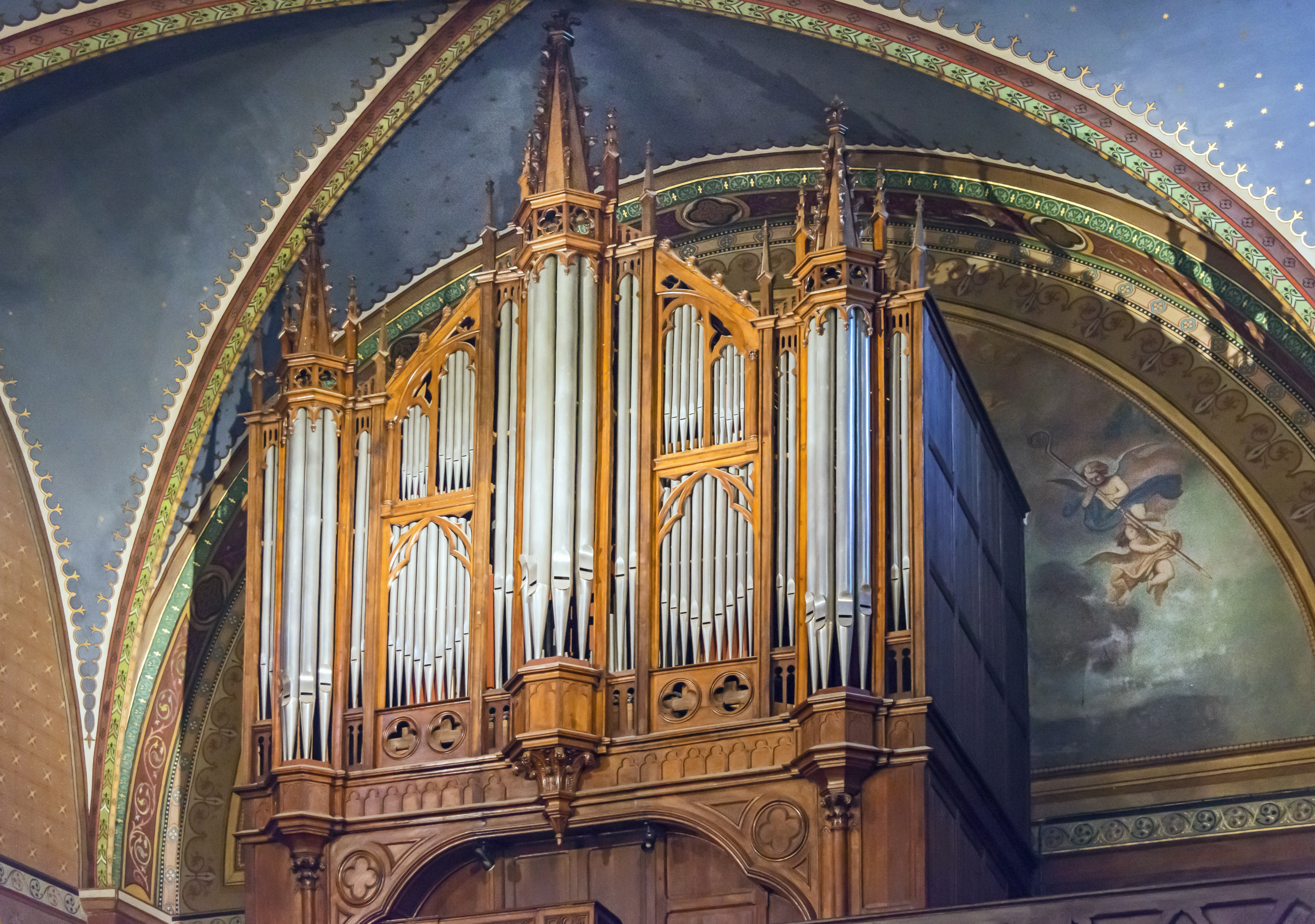
Castelnau-d'Estrétefonds

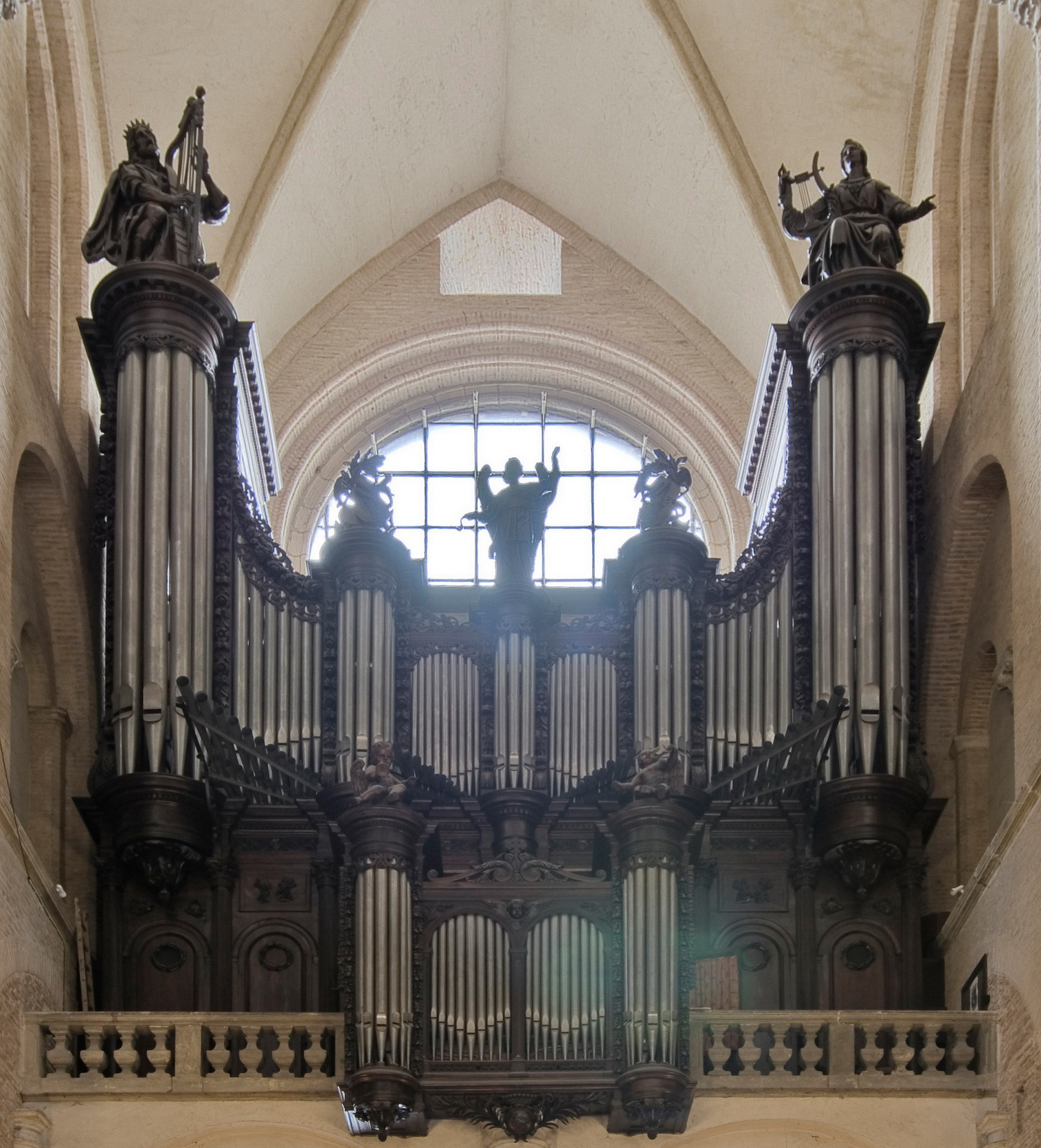
Basilica of Saint-Sernin, Toulouse.

==== In Spain ====
- Alegia: San Juan
- Azkoitia: Santa María
- Azpeitia: Basílica de Loyola
- Barcelona: Crypt of Sagrada Família
- Bilbao: Santa María de Begoña
- Getaria (Guetaria): San Salvador
- Irún: Santa María
- Lekeitio: Basílica de la Asunción de Nuestra Señora (Lekeitio)
- Madrid: Basílica de San Francisco el Grande
- Mutriku (Motrico): Santa Catalina
- Oiartzun: San Esteban
- Pasaia (Pasajes)
- San Sebastián (Donostia): Résidence de Zorroaga
- San Sebastián (Donostia): San Marcial d’Altza
- San Sebastián (Donostia): Santa María del Coro
- San Sebastián (Donostia): Santa Teresa
- San Sebastián (Donostia): San Vicente
- Sevilla: Escuela de Cristo
- Urnieta: San Miguel
- Vidania (Bidegoyan), San Bartolomé

==== In the United Kingdom ====
- Channel Islands, Jersey: Highlands College
- Cheshire, Warrington: Parr Hall
- Hampshire, Farnborough: St Michael's Abbey
- Hampshire, Isle of Wight: Quarr Abbey
- Manchester: The Town Hall
- Renfrewshire, Paisley: Paisley Abbey

==== In the Netherlands ====
- Amsterdam: Augustinuskerk
- Amsterdam: Joannes en Ursulakapel Begijnhof
- Haarlem: Philharmonie
- The Hague: Walloon Church

==== In Belgium ====
- Brussels: Royal Conservatory of Music
- Gesves : Saint Maximin (50 stops, 4 manuals)
- Ghent: Saint Nicholas' Church, Ghent
- Hasselt: Sacred Heart Church
- Leuven: Jesuit Church Heverlee
- Leuven: Saint Joseph's Church

==== In Portugal ====
- Lisbon, Portugal: Igreja de São Luís dos Franceses
- Lisbon, Portugal: Igreja de São Mamede
- Évora, Portugal: Igreja do Espírito Santo (Évora)

==== In Italy ====
- Rome, Italy: Chapel of the Casa Santa Maria of the Pontifical North American College

In addition, Cavaillé-Coll designed a large but never-built pipe organ for Saint Peter's Basilica, where a 1/10 scale model is preserved.

==== In Denmark ====
- Copenhagen, Denmark: Jesus Church (1890)

==== In Russia ====
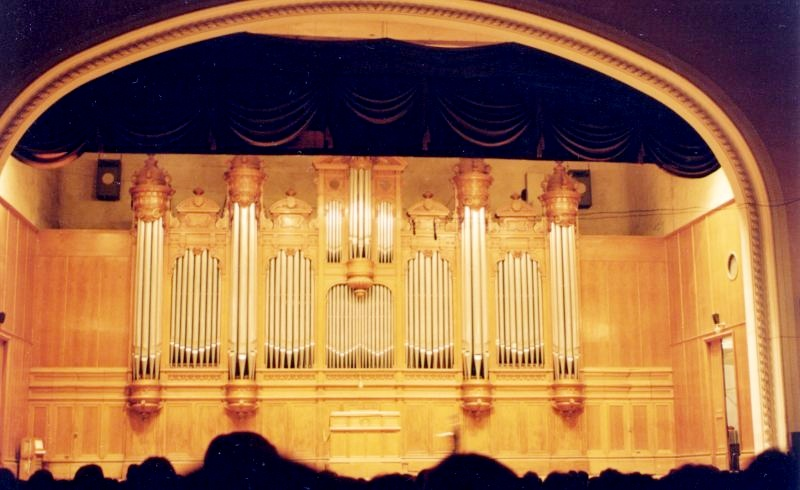
Organ of the Grand Hall of the Moscow Conservatory

- Moscow, Russia: Bolshoi Hall of Moscow Conservatory, Russia (installed by Charles Mutin)

=== In Latin America ===
==== In Venezuela ====
- Caracas: Iglesia de la Parroquia San Francisco. Used for regular service.
- Caracas: Iglesia de la Parroquia Altagracia (Inoperative)
- Caracas: Iglesia de la Parroquia Santa Teresa. Used for regular service.
- Caracas: Iglesia de la Parroquia San José (In a delicate situation)
- Caracas: Parroquia La Encarnación del Valle. After several decades of silence, it's been played regularly since in 2011.
- Los Teques: Catedral (Inoperative)

==== In Brazil ====
- Belém: Catedral da Sé (1882)
- Campinas: Catedral Metropolitana (1883)
- Campo Largo: Igreja Matriz de Nossa Senhora da Piedade (1892)
- Itu: Igreja Matriz Nossa Senhora da Candelária (1882)
- Jundiaí: Catedral de Nossa Senhora do Desterro (1895)
- Lorena: Catedral Nossa Senhora da Piedade (1889)
- Rio de Janeiro: Igreja Nossa Senhora do Carmo da Lapa (1898)
- Rio de Janeiro: Capela do Colégio Sion do Cosme Velhos (Mutin)
- Rio de Janeiro: Igreja de Nossa Senhora de Bonsucesso (Mutin)
- Rio de Janeiro: Capela da Santa Casa (1882)
- Salvador: Igreja da Ordem Terceira do Carmo (1888)
- São Paulo: Igreja de São José do Ipiranga (1863)
- São Paulo: Igreja do Senhor Bom Jesus do Brás (1875)

==== In Mexico ====
- Mazatlán, Mexico: Catedral Basílica de la Inmaculada Concepción

==== In Chile ====
- Valparaíso, Chile: Iglesia de los Sagrados Corazones (French Fathers Church) (1872)

==== In Argentina ====
Most of the instruments in this list were sold and installed by Mutin-Cavaillé Coll, successor of Cavaillé Coll business after his death in 1899. Argentina was a strong demander of pipe organs in the first decades of XXth century, in such degree that the company installed a branch in Buenos Aires city at that time, with two shops: one located in street Estados Unidos number 3199, the other one in street 24 de Noviembre number 884.

- Lujan, Basilica de Lujan
- Basílica del Santísimo Sacramento (1912)
- Capilla del Colegio "La Salle" (1926)
- Iglesia de San Juan Bautista (ca. 1920)
- Basílica del Sagrado Corazón de Jesús (ca. 1906)
- Basílica de San Nicolás de Bari (órgano principal)
- Basílica de San Nicolás de Bari (órgano de la cripta)
- Capilla de la "Casa de la empleada"
- Parroquia de "Nuestra Señora del Valle"
- Parroquia de "San Martín de Tours" (ca. 1910)
- Parroquia de "San Cristobal"
- Catedral de San Isidro (1906)
- Parroquia de "Nuestra Señora de Aránzazu" (San Fernando) (1907)
- Parroquia de "San Francisco Solano" (Bella Vista) (1906)

=== In Costa Rica ===
- Parroquia Inmaculada Concepción (Heredia) (ca. 1904)
- Parroquia Nuestra Señora de la Soledad (San José) (ca. 1906)

=== In Asia ===
- Fuji, Japan: Haus Sonnenschein
- Beijing, China: Beitang (in regular use through at least 1938)

== Asteroid ==
Cavaillé-Coll's name was given to an asteroid: 5184 Cavaillé-Coll.
