= Coqs de Courbevoie =

Professional ice hockey in Courbevoie, France

- City: Courbevoie, France
- League: Division 2; 2019–present
- Founded: 1972; 54 years ago
- Home arena: Thierry Monier Ice Rink at Centre Charras
- Colors: Red, black, green
- Website: coqs-hockey.fr

Franchise history
- 1972–92: Centre olympique de Courbevoie
- 1992–98: Centre olympique de Courbevoie; Les Cocqs
- 1998–present: Club olympique de Courbevoie; Les Cocqs

The Coqs de Courbevoie (English: Courbevoie Roosters) are an ice hockey team based in Courbevoie, Hauts-de-Seine, France.

== History ==
The club was founded in 1972, coinciding with the opening of the city's ice rink at the newly built Centre Charras. Philippe Lacarrière, player-coach for the Français Volants, was approached by a friend who sat on the Courbevoie city council to help set up a resident club at the new facility. Lacarrière agreed, on the condition that the club be primarily geared towards minor hockey, rather than professionalism.

Lacarrière initially enlisted Français Volants goalie Eric Mayer to run Courbevoie's hockey academy, but in 1973 Mayer was succeeded by Thierry Monier, himself a player and minor hockey assistant coach for the Volants. Monier would remain with Courbevoie for thirty-three years, a French hockey coaching record.

The team's name was chosen because it was phonetically similar to the initials of the Centre olympique de Courbevoie, the multisports association founded by deputy and Courbevoie mayor Charles Deprez, to which the hockey club was affiliated between 1972 and 1998.

In 1998, the club left the Centre olympique de Courbevoie to become the Club olympique de Courbevoie, an independent association focused on hockey and figure skating.

Monnier retired in 2006 and died the following year of complications stemming from liver surgery. For his services to the community, Courbevoie's ice rink was renamed "Patinoire Thierry-Monier".

For the most part, Courbevoie has stuck to its grassroots mandate, and has never figured at the top level of French men's hockey, although it did enjoy occasional success at the second-tier level.

== Thierry Monier shooting ==
On 19 February 2005 during a home game against Caen, Thierry Monier was shot by Mansur Bazukov (also transliterated as Mansour Bazoukov), a 59-year old minor hockey coach from the Russian Federation. Monier had earlier served as a panel member for a French Ice Sports Federation coaching exam that Bazukov had failed. For his part, Bazukov felt that French evaluators were unqualified to judge his methods. Monier was hit in the legs, neck and one hand, but survived the attack. Bazukov was sentenced to four years in prison for "intentional violence with a weapon", but he was released on medical grounds and died shortly after.

== Notable personnel ==
=== French Ice Hockey Hall of Fame ===
- Thierry Monier (2016)
