= Parc Pierre-Lagravère =

Park in Colombes, a suburb of Paris

Coordinates: 48°55′32″N 2°13′52″E

- Interactive map of Parc Pierre-Lagravère
- Address: Rue Paul-Bert
- Location: Colombes, Hauts-de-Seine, France
- Surface: 109,129 m^{2}
- Public transit: Parc Pierre-Lagravère

Construction
- Years active: 1973–present

Parc départemental Pierre-Lagravère, often called by its old name, Parc de l'île Marante, is a public park located on the banks of the river Seine in Colombes, northwest of Paris. It is also the seat of Pôle sportif Piere-Lagravère (formerly Centre sportif municipal du Parc Lagravère), a public multisports complex.

Its common name comes from its location on île Marante, a former island in the Seine. The island's now disappeared English-style garden designed by Claude-Henri Watelet, Parc du Moulin Joly, was a favorite getaway for the local nobility during the Ancien Régime. The area was also a popular subject for painters, especially impressionists such as Gustave Caillebotte and Claude Monet, who lived in Colombes and nearby Argenteuil, respectively, and frequently sailed the Seine.

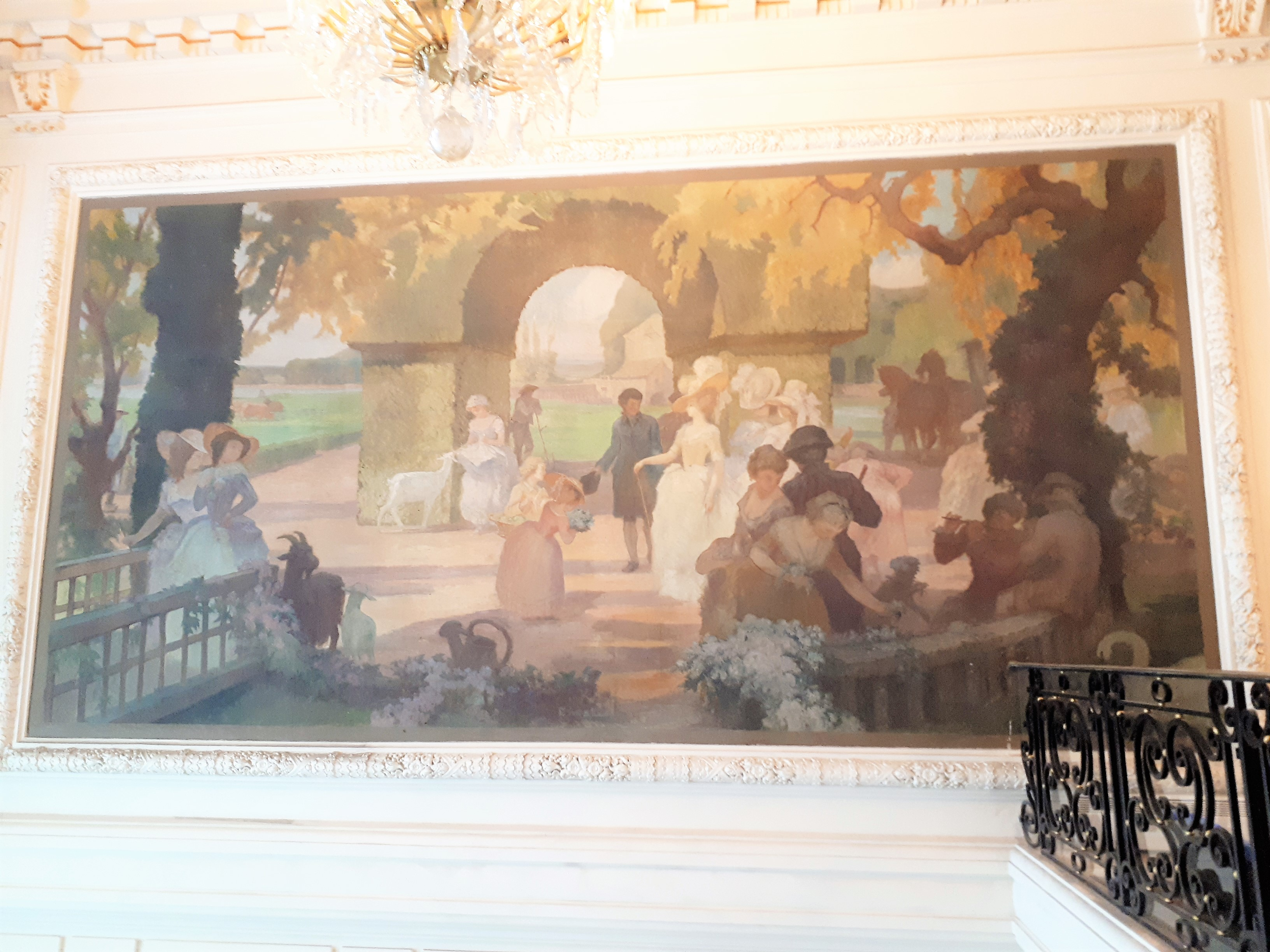
1932 fresco representing Marie Antoinette at the Parc du Moulin Joly, located inside Colombes city hall

The island was joined to the mainland circa 1965 to provide foundations for the building of the A86 autoroute, which today stands between the park and downtown Colombes (several bridges connect both sides). The city of Colombes and the department of Hauts-de-Seine split jurisdiction over the newly accessible land. The city used parts of it to create a second sports and recreation district, separate from the historic Stade Yves-du-Manoir. Meanwhile, the department took over the surrounding areas and remodeled them as a public park loosely inspired by the old Watelet garden. The park opened in 1973, and in 1985 was renamed after Pierre Lagravère, who was the first president of the département upon its creation in 1968.

== Cycling and jogging ==
Parc Lagravère is the final stop of the Promenade Bleue, a bike and walking trail created in 2010 that became a leg of the Paris–London Avenue Verte in 2012. Since 1991, the venue has offered a BMX park, which is managed by a resident club. The route of the 1924 Summer Olympics cross country race ran alongside île Marante, although it stayed on the dam built on the mainland side, and did not venture onto the island proper as only a barge allowed crossings at the time.

Centre aquatique olympique Laure-et-Florent Manaudou
- Former names: Piscine olympique de Colombes
- Operator: Vert Marine
- Type: Indoor, outdoor
- Dimensions: Length: 50 metre (main); Width: 21 metre (main)

Construction
- Opened: 1969 (original); 2024 (remodel)
- Architects: Henry Pottier (original); Arcos (2024 remodel)

== Pôle sportif Pierre-Lagravère ==
=== Current facilities ===
==== Centre aquatique olympique Laure-et-Florent Manaudou ====
The first step taken to establish île Marante as a sports destination was to replace the city's relatively recent outdoor swimming pool, located downtown in the vicinity of Stade Yves-du-Manoir, with a new indoor facility on the former island, which opened in 1969. Like the park's future ice rink, it was designed by architect Henry Pottier, who was in charge of an urban renewal plan for the northwestern districts of Colombes at the time. In addition to hosting the hometown Colombes Natation, it has also been used by Racing Club de France due to that club's longstanding ties to the city.

The pool was renovated and expanded over three years, in part for use as a training facility during the 2024 Olympic Games. The new version, which adds several features including a heated outdoor pool, was inaugurated for the general public on 28 June 2025. On this occasion, it took the name of swimming siblings Laure and Florent Manaudou, both Olympic and world champions.

==== Colombes Tennis Club ====
Delivered in 1975, the Colombes Tennis Club offers eleven courts and is managed by an eponymous association. The five indoor courts are made of natural clay, while the six outdoor courts rely on a mix of acrylic (GreenSet), synthetic clay and natural clay.

Patinoire Philippe-Candeloro
- Former names: Colombes Municipal Ice Rink
- Capacity: 880 (seated); 1320 (total)
- Field size: 56 × 26 metre

Construction
- Built: 1973
- Opened: 16 January 1974
- Closed: 12 June 2024
- Architect: Henry Pottier

Tenant
- Anges de Colombes (2002–2024)

=== Disused facilities ===
==== Patinoire Philippe-Candeloro ====
An ice rink was added to the park in 1973. It was home to the French Ice Sports Federation's national figure skating training center, and hosted the 1992 French Figure Skating Championships. In 2018, it was renamed after World Championship and Olympic medalist figure skater Philippe Candeloro, who grew up and started his career in Colombes.

The venue served as the home ice for the Français Volants, Paris' oldest existing hockey team, across several stints in the mid 1970s and 1980s. It also hosted the 1978 hockey Coupe de France final. However, it was not associated with a true resident hockey club until another organization, the Anges du Vésinet (lit. 'Le Vésinet Angels'), faced with the permanent loss of their rink to a fire, moved there in 2002, later changing their name to Anges de Colombes.

Although recognized as "a legendary place" by the city, Colombes mayor Patrick Chaimovitch (EELV) announced on 22 March 2022 that the rink would close due to its excessive energy consumption. He deemed that previous administrations had not invested enough to modernize the building, and refused to finance a full renovation which he estimated at €15 million. The rink suspended its activities on 12 June 2024, and the city council voted against re-opening it on 10 October. Candeloro protested the shutdown of the facility bearing his name, while the local figure skating club and a public interest group jointly filed suit against the city. Their efforts were ultimately dismissed by an administrative court on 21 July 2025.
