= Henry Pottier =

French architect (born 1912)

- Born: 21 February 1912; Vernon, Eure, France
- Died: 7 September 2000 (aged 88); Paris, France
- Education: École nationale supérieure des Beaux-Arts
- Occupation: Architect
- Awards: Second Grand Prix de Rome (1944)
- Buildings: Tour Les Poissons; Stade Louis II

Henry Eugène Pottier (21 February 1912 – 7 September 2000), often erroneously written as Henri Pottier, was a French architect. A disciple of Victor Laloux, he won a Prix de Rome in 1944. As it was customary to fill the influential position of Architecte en chef des bâtiments civils et palais nationaux (lit. 'Chief Architect of Civilian Buildings and National Palaces') from among recipients of the award, Pottier ascended to the function in 1968.

He is perhaps best known to the general public as the chief architect of the Front de Seine, a major 1970s redevelopment in the 15th arrondissement of Paris, and several entertainment facilities in the Principality of Monaco, for whose government he was a consulting architect. He designed many public buildings, first in his native Eure, then in the Paris region during the 1960s and 1970s.

An adherent to the Athens Charter, and one of the more prolific representatives of post-World War II functionalism, Pottier had the experience of seeing his work in Clamart publicly singled out by French president Georges Pompidou in 1972, as an example of the style's loss of relevance.

== Major works ==
- École nationale supérieure des travaux publics, Yamoussoukro, Côte d'Ivoire
- Antoine Béclère Hospital, Clamart, France
- Centre sportif municipal Parc Lagravère, Colombes, France
- Saint-Bernard Chapel, Colombes, France
- Henri Mondor University Hospital, Créteil, France
- Auditorium Maurice-Ravel, Lyon, France
- École Polytechnique, Palaiseau, France
- Embassy of Germany, Paris, France
- New Val-de-Grâce Hospital, Paris, France
- Tour Les Poissons at Le Zodiaque, Courbevoie, France
- Stade Louis II, Monaco
- Monte-Carlo Sporting, Monaco
- Higher Institute of Mining, Industry and Geology, Niamey, Niger
