= Basilica of Saint-Sauveur (Rennes) =

Church in Brittany, France

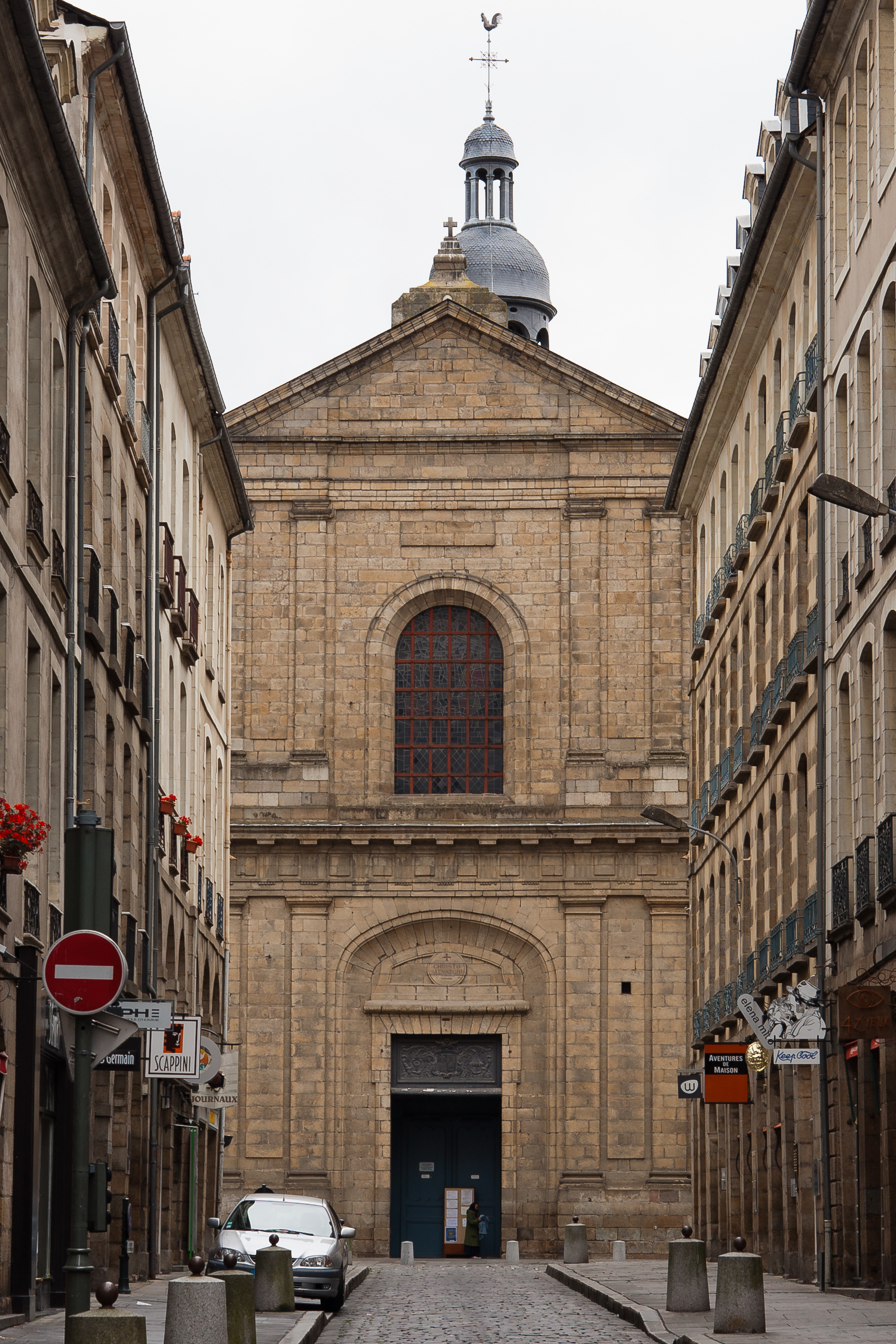
- Façade of the church seen from the rue du Guesclin

Religion
- Affiliation: Roman Catholic Church
- Diocese: Archdiocese of Rennes, Dol, and Saint-Malo
- Rite: Roman
- Ecclesiastical or organizational status: Minor basilica

Location
- Location: Rennes, France
- Interactive map of Basilica of Saint-Sauveur
- Coordinates: 48°06′42″N 1°40′54″W

Architecture
- Architects: François Huguet (plans); Forestier l'Aîné (façade, portal, doors); Antoine Forestier le Jeune (dome of the tower); Daniel Chocat de Grandmaison (belfry)
- Type: church
- Groundbreaking: 1703
- Completed: 1768

The Basilica of Saint-Sauveur in Rennes (French: Basilique Saint-Sauveur de Rennes) is a minor basilica of the Roman Catholic church, dedicated to Our Lady of Miracles and Virtues (French: Notre-Dame des Miracles et Vertus), located in the heart of the historic city of Rennes in Brittany, France. The church was founded under the name of Saint-Sauveur ("Holy Saviour") before the 11th century. Expanded several times and rebuilt in the early 18th century, it was the seat of a parish for nearly three hundred years, until the Second World War, and again from 2002. Following several events described as miraculous in the 14th and 18th centuries, the cult of Mary developed strongly in this church, culminating in its elevation to a basilica in 1916. The building is classical in style and is particularly noteworthy for its furnishings: the baldachin of the high altar, the wrought iron pulpit, the organ, as well as the numerous ex-votos left by the faithful.
