= Nancy Cathedral =

Roman Catholic church in Nancy, Lorraine, France

Nancy Cathedral Cathédrale Notre-Dame-de-l’Annonciation et Saint-Sigisbert
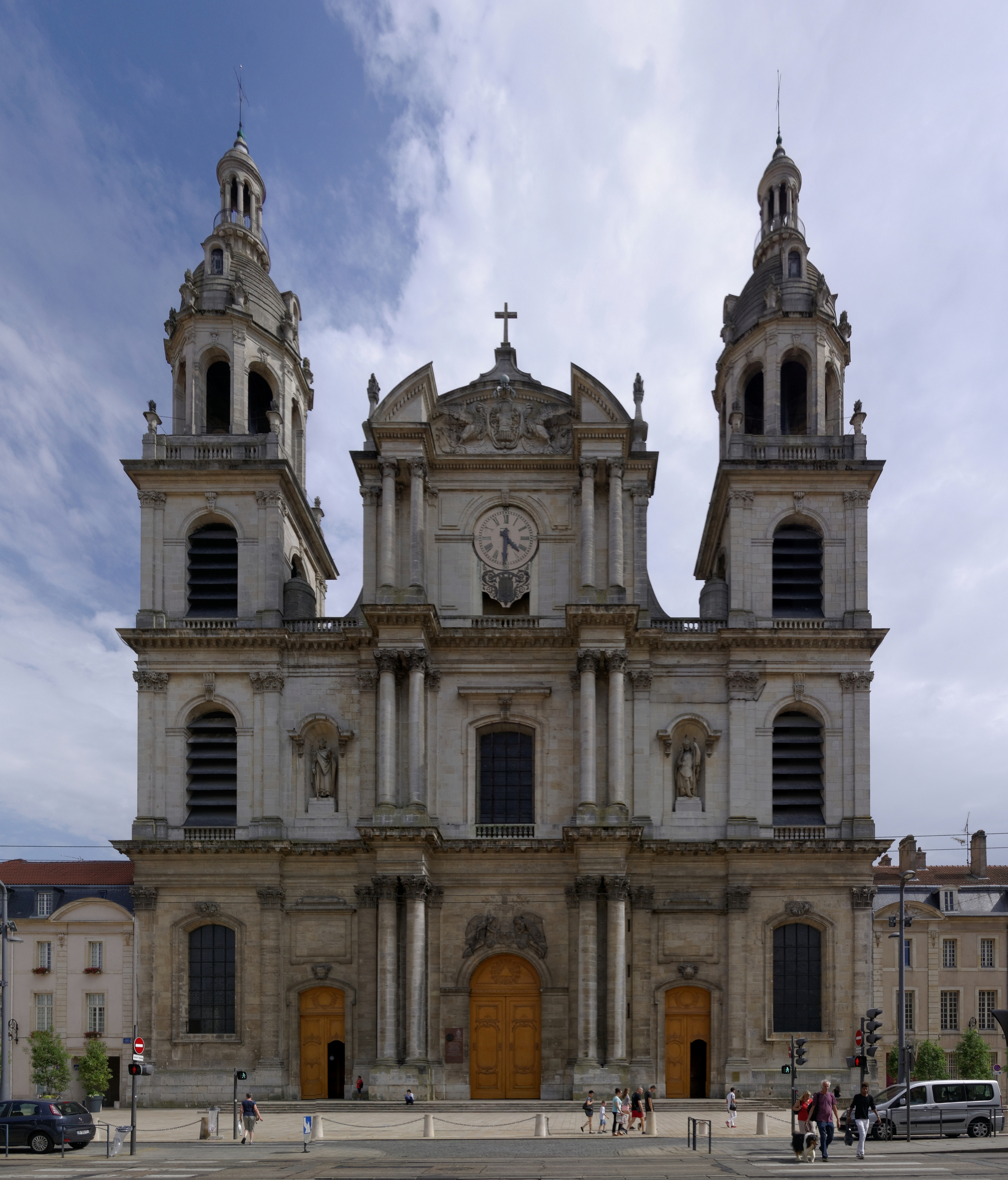
- Nancy Cathedral

Religion
- Affiliation: Roman Catholic Church
- Province: Diocese of Nancy and Toul
- Rite: Roman
- Ecclesiastical or organisational status: Cathedral
- Status: Active

Location
- Location: Nancy, France
- Interactive map of Nancy Cathedral; Cathédrale Notre-Dame-de-l’Annonciation et Saint-Sigisbert
- Coordinates: 48°41′29″N 6°11′10″E

Architecture
- Type: Church
- Style: Baroque
- Groundbreaking: 18th century
- Completed: 19th century

Nancy Cathedral or Cathedral of Our Lady of the Annunciation and St. Sigisbert (French: Cathédrale Notre-Dame-de-l’Annonciation et Saint-Sigisbert) is a Roman Catholic church located in the town of Nancy, Lorraine, France. It was erected in the 18th century. The cathedral is in the Baroque architectural style. It is a national monument and the seat of the Bishop of Nancy and Toul.

== History ==
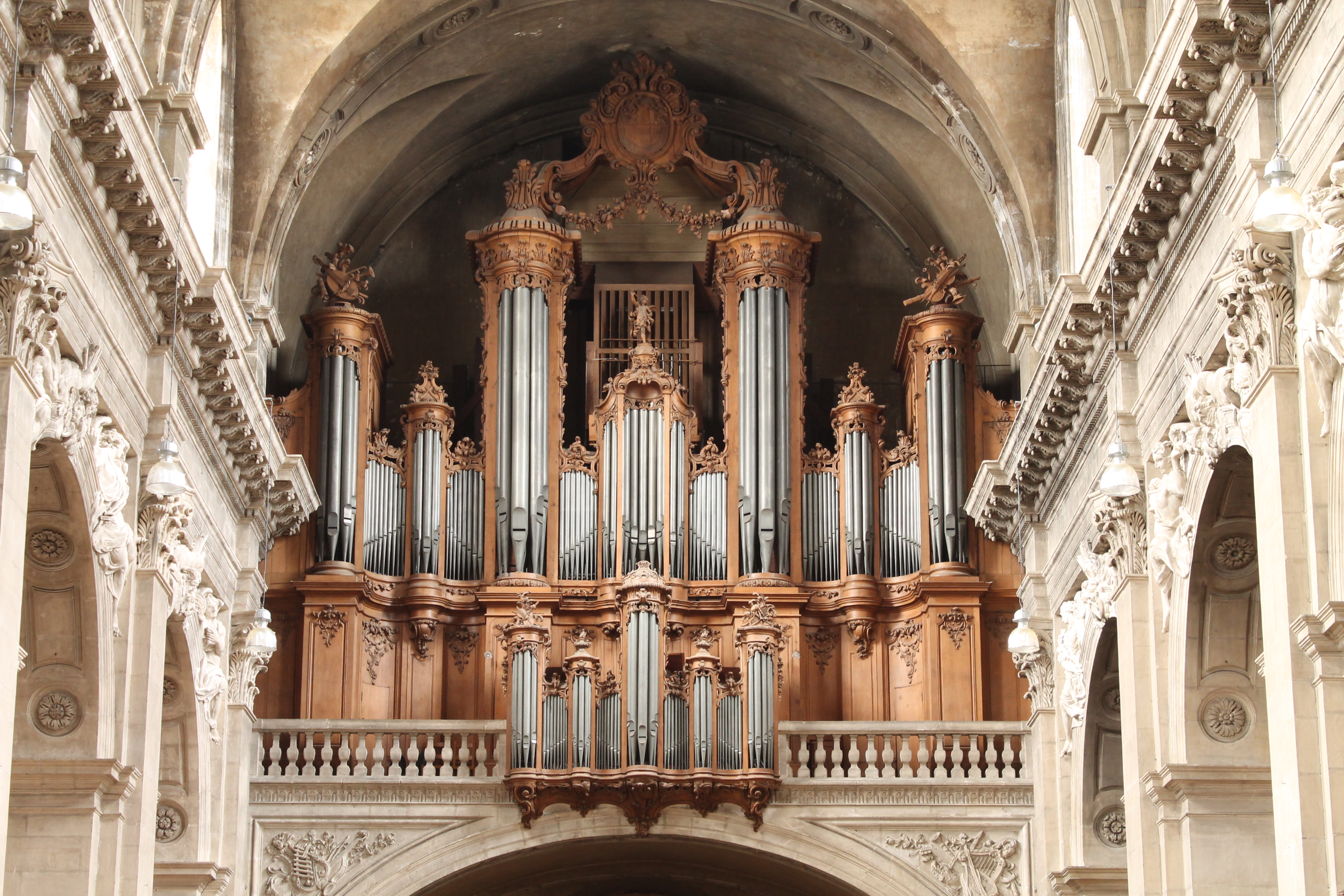
The great organ

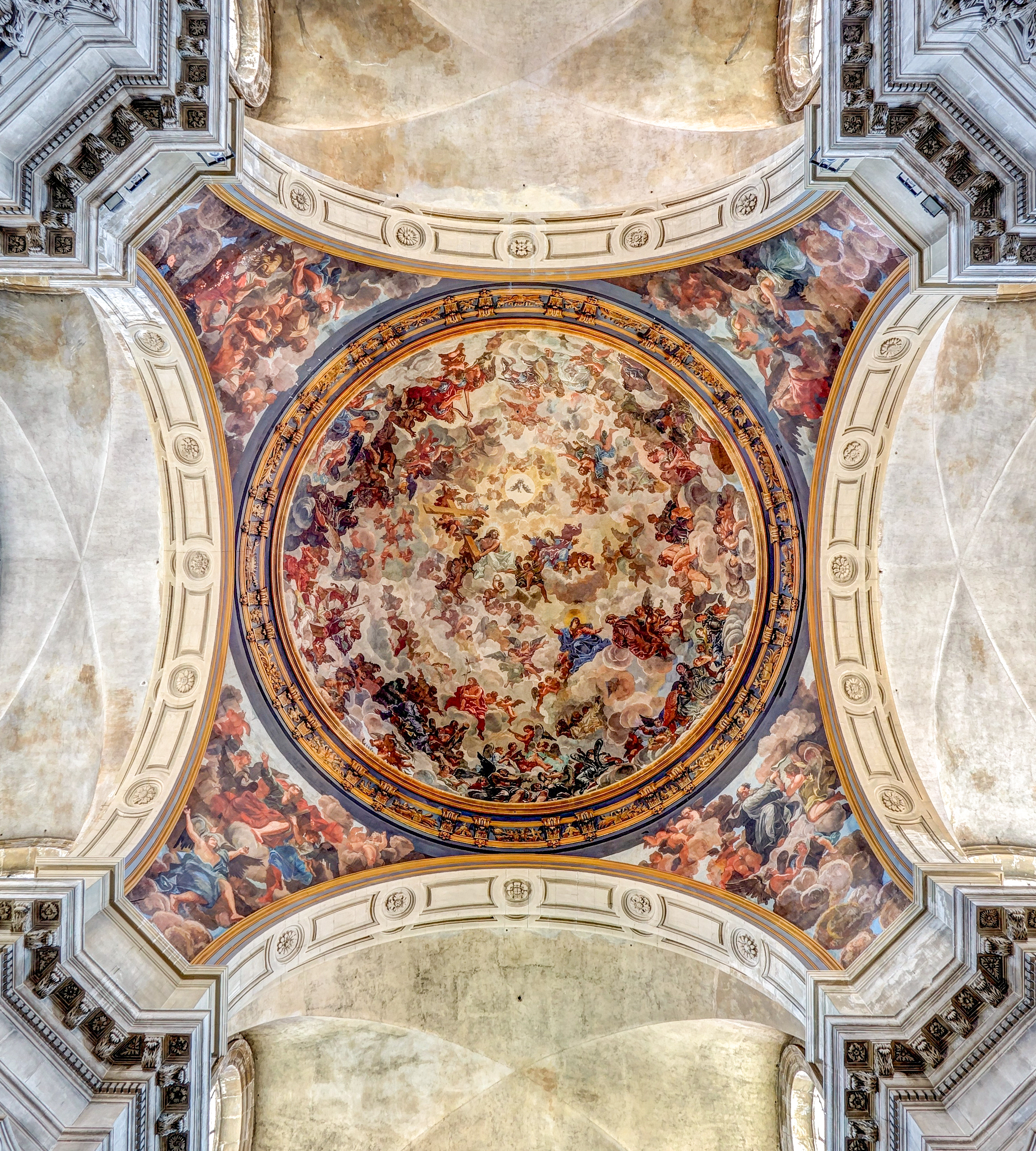
View towards the dome

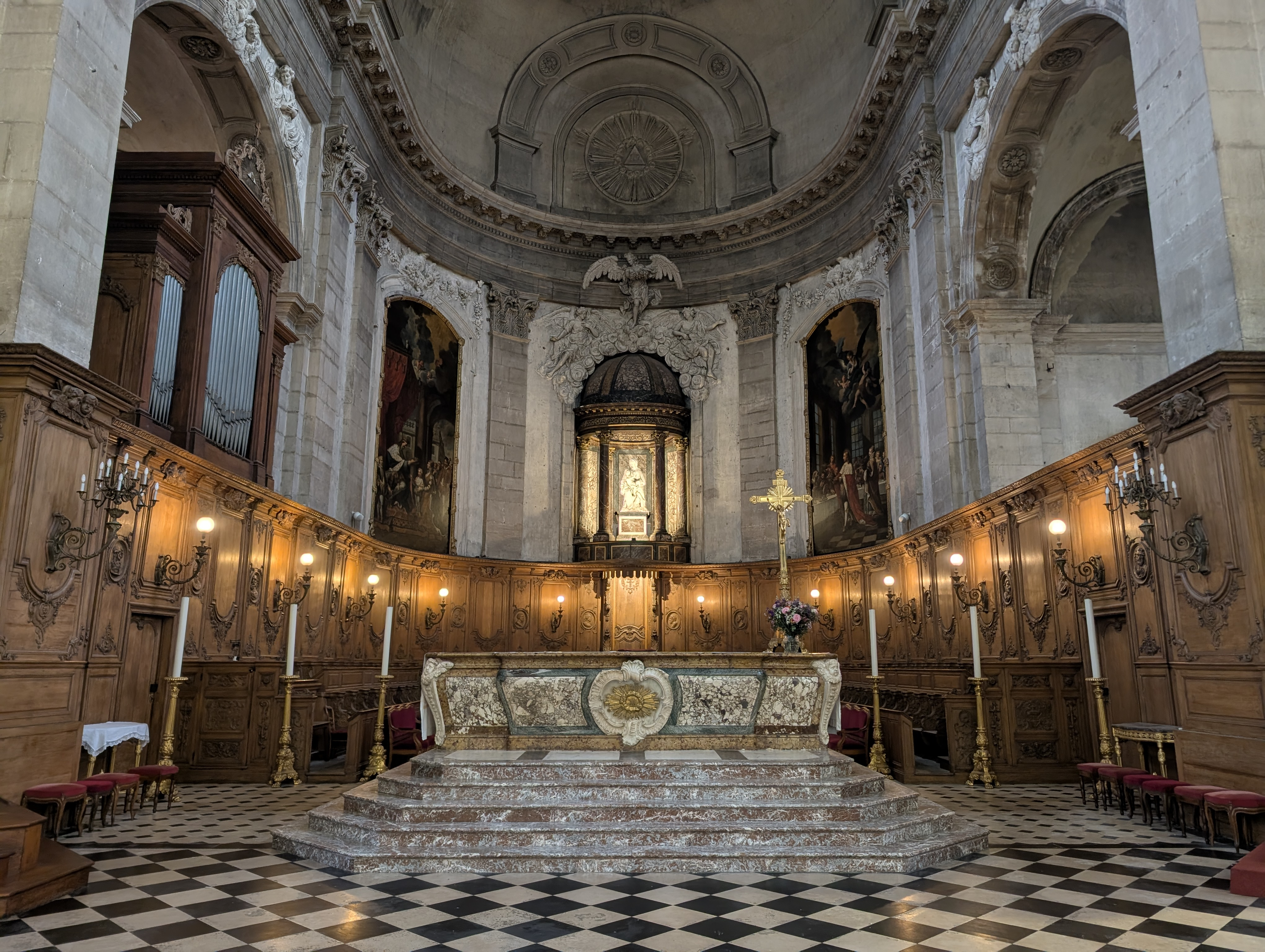
The high altar

King Sigebert III of Austrasia was laid to rest here. Declared a saint later, the cathedral became a pilgrimage site. The cathedral is dedicated to the Holy Virgin and him.

The cathedral's architecture dates mainly to the 17-18th century.

== Organ ==
The great organ of the cathedral of Nancy has been built from 1756 by Nicolas Dupont. One century later (1861), Aristide Cavaillé-Coll signed here its biggest work in France outside of Paris. The organists of these Monument Historique organ are Johann Vexo (since 2009) and Guillaume Beaudoin (since 2014).
