= Aeoline =

In music, aeoline may refer to:

- A type of pipe organ stop
- An early form of the accordion
- A harmonica
