= List of pipe organs =

This is a list and brief description of notable pipe organs in the world, with links to corresponding articles about them.

== Historic organs ==
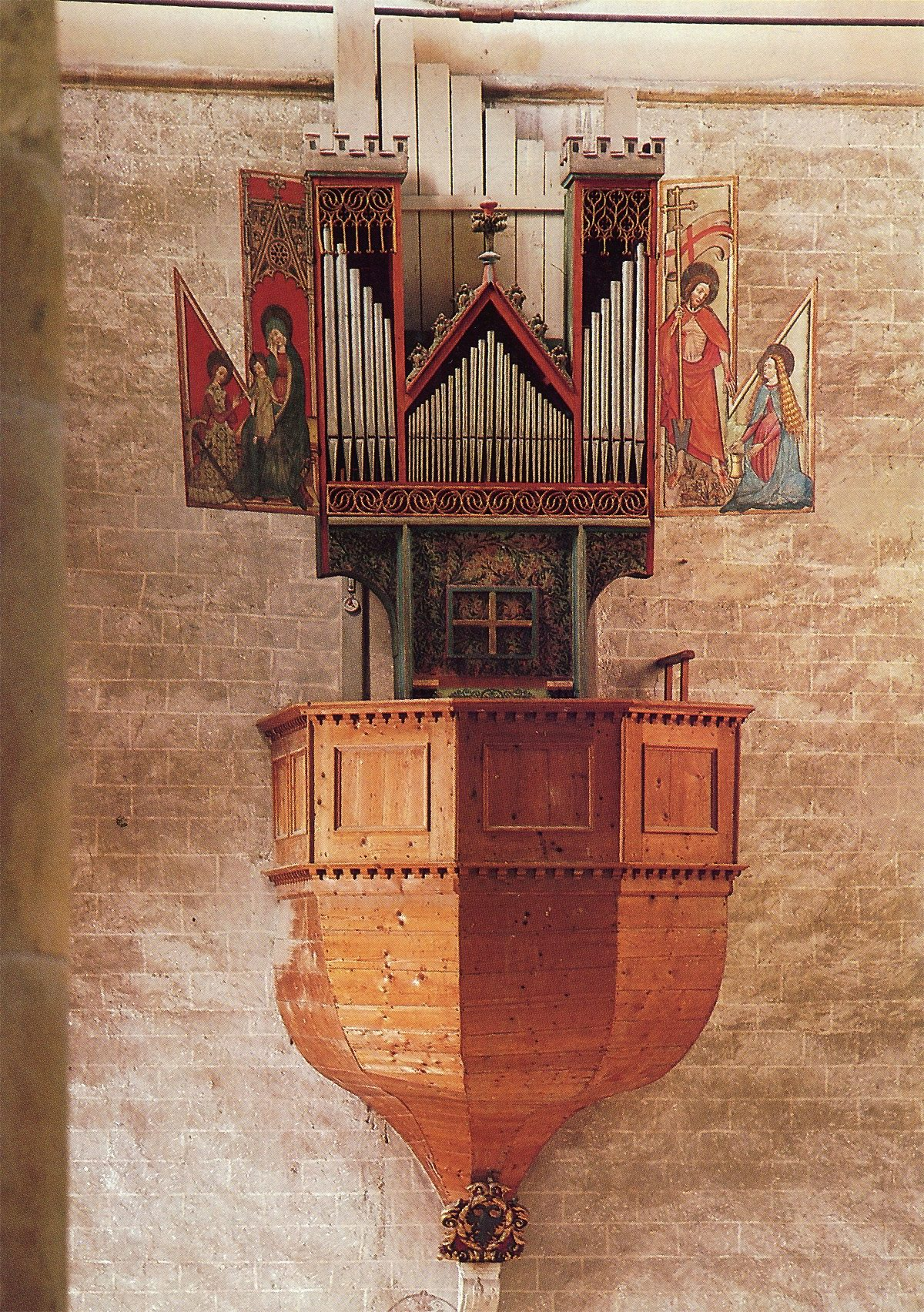
Organ of Basilica of Valère

- The oldest organ in the world which has been restored to playability is the organ of the Church of the Nativity, whose pipes date to the 11th century. The instrument had been buried in the churchyard during the political upheavals of the 13th century, and was unearthed in 1906. It has been restored to a playable state, involving reconstruction of the wooden parts of the organ, and was first played again in 2025 after nearly 800 years of inactivity.
- It is generally agreed upon that the world's oldest playable pipe organ, including the instrument's mechanism, is located in the Basilica of Valère in Sion, Switzerland. Built around 1435, most of the case is original, but only 12 pipes are original, as the rest have been replaced during restorations.
- It said that the organ in the church of St. Andreas at Ostönnen (Westfalia, Germany) is even older than the organ mentioned above. Its wind chests and divisions date back to 1425 - 1430, and half the pipes are still original. However, the case and key action were rebuilt in the Baroque period.
- In the San Petronio Basilica in Bologna there is a Lorenzo da Prato organ built in 1475 with a lot of original stops, and is still playable after a restoration took place in 1986.
- In the Old Cathedral (Duomo Vecchio) in Brescia (Italy) there is a Giangiacomo Antegnati (1536) - Fratelli Serassi (1826) organ. When in the 19th century the Antegnati was restored and enlarged, the priests of the church, in admiration of Antegnati masterpiece, asked Serassi to preserve all the old pipes.
- The organ in Évora Cathedral in Portugal was built in 1562. Some of the materials used belong to a previous instrument from 1544. This organ is fully functional today. It had interventions in 1694 by Heitor Lobo, 1760 by Pasquale Gaetano Oldovini and 1967 Dirk Andries Flentrop.
- In Wilhelmsburg Castle in Schmalkalden, Germany, there is a historic organ built between 1587 and 1589 by Daniel Meyer. Notably its facade pipes are veneered with ivory.
- In Bälinge Church in Bälinge, Sweden, there is an organ built in 1632 with 51 pipes. It was constructed by George Herman (died ca 1655) and Philip Eisenmenger (died after 1657) in Stockholm. The Wood carvings on the facade were made by the German master carver Mårten Redtmer (died 1655), who also worked on the royal warship Wasa.
- The Johann Woeckerl Organ in the Church of St George in Sopron, Hungary, was built in 1633, but the pipes of its Holzflöte 8 stop were made in 1580. Among the church's congregation was Vitus "Veit" Bach, a miller whose great-great-grandson Johann Sebastian Bach would compose the most celebrated organ music in the world.
- The organ of St Patrick's Cathedral is one of the largest in Ireland with over 4,000 pipes. Parts of it date from a Renatus Harris instrument of 1695.
- The oldest complete surviving church organ in the UK is that by Renatus Harris in St Botolph's Aldgate, and dates from 1744.
- The oldest fully functional organ in the Netherlands is that by Jan van Covelen in Laurenskerk of Alkmaar. It is a choir organ dating from 1511.
- The organ in the chapel de los Anaya in the Old Cathedral of Salamanca dates to the 14th or 15th century, making it the oldest organ in Spain.
- The Organ Historical Society maintains a citation list of historic North American organs.

== The largest pipe organs in the world ==
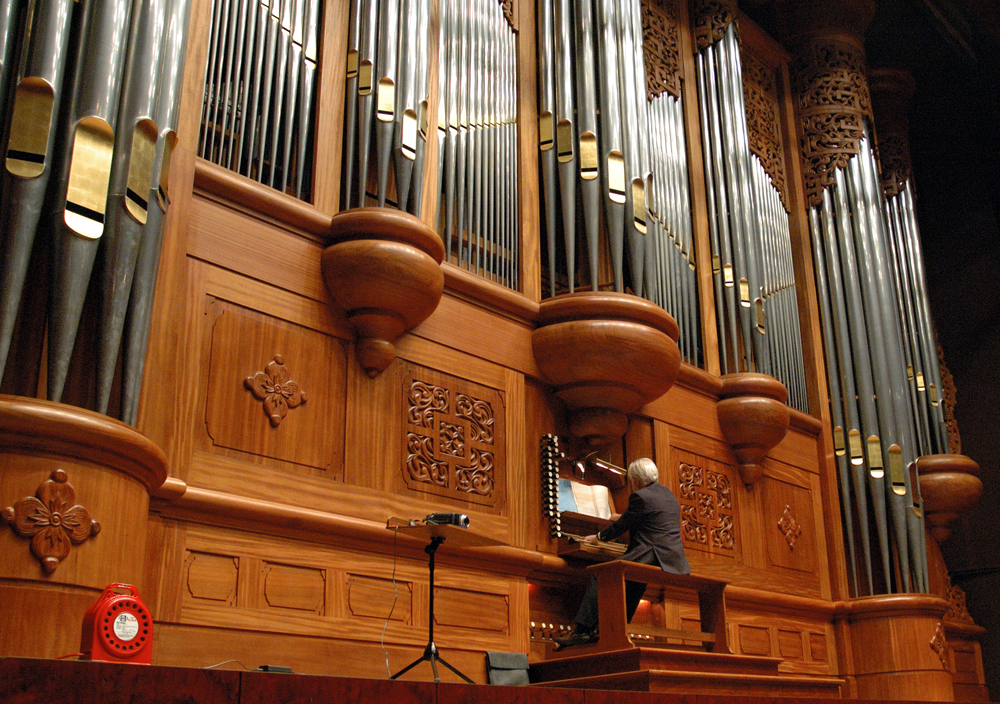
The National Theater and Concert Hall organ in Taiwan

There are many methodologies for comparison of organs according to their size. One of the most encompassing methodologies was described by Michał Szostak.

=== Civic and concert hall organs ===
| Organ | Country | Location | Builder | Specifications | Details |
|---|---|---|---|---|---|
| Boardwalk Hall Auditorium Organ | United States | Boardwalk Hall Atlantic City, New Jersey | Midmer-Losh Organ Company, 1929–32 | 314 stops; 7 manuals; 449 ranks; 33,112 pipes | The largest pipe organ ever built, based on number of pipes. It weighs approximately 150 tons. Most of the organ has not functioned since 1944; a partial restoration in 1998 was largely reversed by construction damage during a renovation of the Boardwalk Hall shortly afterwards. A full restoration is currently underway to return the organ to playing order in a $16 million effort that, as of 2023, has not been completed. The Historic Organ Restoration Committee reports that as of 2023, 95% of the Ballroom Organ is operational, and 67% of the Main Auditorium organ is operational. Restoration work is ongoing to the extent that public concerts have resumed.: It contains the world's largest Diaphone, the 64 ft Diaphone-Dulzian in the Pedal Right Division, which is also one of only two full-length 64 ft stops in the world, the other being the 64 ft Contra-Trombone stop at the Sydney Town Hall Grand Organ (See below); The Grand Ophicleide in the Pedal Right Division, speaking on 100" wind pressure, is also recognised by Guinness World Records as the loudest organ stop in the entire world. It is described as having "a pure trumpet note of ear-splitting volume, more than six times the volume of the loudest locomotive whistle". In fact, the Grand Ophicleide produces 130 dB at 1 meter distance. |
| Wanamaker Grand Court Organ | United States | Wanamaker's (Until 2025 Macy's Center City), Philadelphia, Pennsylvania | Los Angeles Art Organ Co., 1904; Wanamaker store Organ dept, 1914–17, 1924–30 | 376 stops; 6 manuals; 464 ranks; 28,750 pipes | The largest pipe organ in the world, based on number of ranks and physical mass weight. It ranks second in the world based on number of pipes. It is the largest fully operational musical instrument in the world, with the weight of 287 tons. This concert organ was initially constructed for the 1904 World's Fair in St. Louis; it was designed by George Ashdown Audsley. The organ was purchased by John Wanamaker for his palatial Philadelphia store; disassembled, the organ filled 13 rail cars. Uniquely, the Wanamaker Organ had from the beginning full-time organ fabricators and technicians, a true "organ shop", building it to luxurious standards of quality. There are many recordings of this organ. It was played twice a day, six days a week, until the closure of the department store in which it was housed. As of October 2025, it is publicly performed during occasional concerts.: Its 88-rank String Organ is the largest division in any pipe organ in the largest single organ chamber.; Its Pedal Organ of 75 ranks (supplemented by additional borrowed ranks) is the largest Pedal department of any instrument, possessing unsurpassed richness of tone with the capacity for subtle bass gradation in volume and complete separateness of musical line from the manual stops.; At 71 ranks, its Swell Division is the largest Swell ever built.; It is the largest organ built to a straight design with minimal resorting to unification.; It has more expression pedals (10) than any other pipe organ, and 8 separately expressive pipe divisions.; Despite its formidable size and power, its strength and hallmark is in musical subtlety and nuance.; It is also recognized in the Guinness Book of World Records. |
| St Stephen's Cathedral Organ | Germany | St. Stephen's Cathedral Passau, Germany Eisenbarth, 1978–81 | | 203 stops; 5 manuals; 223 registers; 17,974 pipes | With its 17,974 pipes and 233 registers, the organ in Passau's cathedral is considered to be the largest Catholic church organ in the world and the largest organ in Europe. It ranks at the fifth place with its number of pipes. |
| Auditorio Nacional (National Auditorium) | Mexico | Mexico City | Pontificia Fabbrica d'Organi Cav. Giovanni Tamburini CREMA - ITALIA | 181 stops; 5 manuals; 250 ranks; 15,633 pipes | The largest concert hall organ in the Western Hemisphere and world's 6th largest concert hall organ (2nd and 7th respectively, if the Midmer-Losh in Boardwalk Hall is included). |
| Newberry Memorial Organ | United States | Woolsey Hall, Yale University, New Haven, Connecticut | E. M. Skinner | 142 stops; 4 manuals; 197 ranks; 12,617 pipes | The largest fully operational concert hall organ in the US. It is the third largest fully operational concert hall organ in the world, behind Auditorio Nacional and the Sydney Opera House organ. |
| Barry Norris Residence | United States | Birmingham, Alabama | | 161 stops; 5 manuals; 200 ranks; 11,200 pipes | The world's largest house organ. It can be played from the console in the living room. |
| Great Tamburini Organ | Brazil | Basilica of Our Lady Help of Christians, Niterói, Rio de Janeiro | Pontificia Fabrica d'Organi Tamburini | 141 stops; 7 manuals; 11,130 pipes | The largest organ in Brazil. The pipe organ was installed in the basilica in 1956. It consists of a main body and two secondary bodies: Principal, Choral, and Echo. It is controlled by two consoles, one with 5 manuals and the other with 2. |
| Curtis Organ | United States | Irvine Auditorium, University of Pennsylvania, Philadelphia, Pennsylvania | Austin Organ Company, Op. 1416, 1926 | 122 stops; 4 manuals; 163 ranks; 10,731 pipes | This organ was built for the Sesquicentennial Exposition in Philadelphia. At the time of its installation it was the fourth largest organ in the world. The presence of the Wanamaker Organ ranked it as the second largest pipe organ in Philadelphia. For many years it was ranked as 11th largest by pipe count, but recent combining of instruments under single console control have placed it in the top 25 largest in the world by ranks or pipe count. |
| Sydney Opera House Grand Organ | Australia | Sydney Opera House, Sydney | | 130 stops; 5 manuals; 207 ranks; 10,888 pipes | The largest organ with mechanical key action. |
| Royal Albert Hall Organ | United Kingdom | Royal Albert Hall, London | | 147 stops; 4 manuals; 9,997 pipes | Second largest pipe organ in the United Kingdom. Also known as the Voice of Jupiter. |
| National Kaohsiung Center for the Arts Organ | Taiwan | Fengshan District, Kaohsiung | Johannes Klais Orgelbau | 105 stops; 158 ranks; >9,000 pipes | This is the largest organ in Asia. |
| Sydney Town Hall Grand Organ | Australia | Sydney | | 127 stops; 5 manuals; 8,756 pipes | This organ was for many years after its inception the largest in the world, and was the largest built in the nineteenth century. It remains the world's largest organ without any electric action components and is one of only two organs with a full-length 64 ft stop (the Contra-Trombone in the pedal) (click here for a sound sample). (The other being the Boardwalk Hall Auditorium Organ.) |
| Helsinki Music Centre Concert Organ (main concert hall) | Finland | Helsinki Music Centre, Helsinki | | 122 stops; 5 manuals; 125 ranks; 7,999 pipes | The Helsinki Music Centre is home to the monumental Rieger organ, the largest organ in Finland and currently also the largest concert hall organ in Europe. Built by the Austrian company Rieger Orgelbau, the instrument was inaugurated on 1 January 2024 with a concert by the French organist Olivier Latry. The organ was designed by a dedicated artistic working group. Its striking visual appearance was created by the Austrian artist and organ designer Harald Schwarz and further developed together with Wendelin Eberle of Rieger. The project cost approximately 4.4 million euros. The instrument features both a mechanical console integrated into the organ façade and a second mobile electric console located on the orchestral stage. Particularly innovative is the fourth manual of the mechanical console, where several stops — Violoncelle 8′, Principal 4′, Clarinette 8′ and Glissando 4′ — are built in quarter-tone tuning with 24 notes per octave, allowing the performance of microtonal music alongside the traditional organ repertoire. |
| Fred J. Cooper Memorial Organ | United States | Marian Anderson Hall, Kimmel Center for the Performing Arts, Philadelphia | Dobson Pipe Organ Builders, Op. 76 | 124 stops; 4 manuals; 97 ranks; 6,938 pipes | The largest mechanical-action concert hall organ in the US. The largest pipes are made of wood and are about two feet square and 32 feet tall. The smallest pipes are the size of a slender drinking straw. Several of the larger metal pipes are placed in the organ's case to form a visual display, or façade. They are made from an alloy of highly polished tin. These pipes are arranged in a broadly curving arc, and lean outward at a four-degree angle, thereby coinciding with the architecture of the Hall's balconies. This is the first instrument ever constructed with pipes of this size mounted in this manner. |
| Kotzschmar Memorial Organ | United States | Portland, Maine | Austin Organ Company, 1912 | >170 stops; 5 manuals; 96 ranks; 6,554 pipes | |
| Budapest Palace of Art Pipe Organ | Hungary | Budapest | Mühleisen, Pécs | 91 stops; 5 manuals; 134 ranks; 6,554 pipes | |
| Davis Concert Organ | Canada | Winspear Centre, Edmonton, Alberta | Orgues Létourneau of Saint-Hyacinthe, Québec | 96 stops; 122 ranks; 6,551 pipes | |
| Sonnenorgel | Germany | Pfarrkirche St. Peter und Paul (Peterskirche), Görlitz | Mathis Orgelbau | 96 stops; 4 manuals; 96 ranks; 6,219 pipes | |
| Stockholm Concert hall organ | Sweden | Stockholm Concert hall | Grönlunds Orgelbyggeri, Gammelstad. | 96 stops; 4 manuals; 6,100 pipes | With help from public donators, whose names were engraved into the pipes, the organ stood finished 1982. The original organ from 1926 was replaced due to its insufficient tonal quality. Some pipes from the original organ were reused in the new organ. |
| Visser-Rowland Organ | United States | Performing Arts Center, University of Texas at Austin, Austin, Texas | | 67 stops; 5,315 pipes | |

=== Largest church organ per country ===
| Country | Location | Builder | Specifications | Details |
|---|---|---|---|---|
| Argentina | Basílica del Santísimo Sacramento (Buenos Aires) | Mutin-Cavaillé-Coll (1915) | 74 stops; 4 manuals; 4,980 pipes | The Mutin-Cavaillé-Coll in the Basílica del Santísimo Sacramento is the largest pipe organ in Sudamérica, and the largest pipe organ building by Cavaillé-Coll outside of France. |
| Austria | Saint Stephan's Cathedral (Stephansdom), Vienna | Rieger Orgelbau (2020), Steinhoff, Kauffmann | 130 stops; 5 manuals; 12,616 pipes | During 2017-2020 the main and side organs were rebuilt and can be played from one console with additional 55 stops. There are other two organs in the cathedral, one of them with two manuals is movable. |
| Czechia | Church of Saint Maurice, Olomouc | Michael Engler (1730–1745) | 95 stops; 5 manuals; 8 engines(?); 1 foot; 8,012 pipes | One of the largest organs in Central Europe built by the Wrocław master Michael Engler, commissioned by the sea provost František Gregor Gianini. The instrument had originally 3 manuals, 44 registers and about 2,500 pipes. Between 1959 and 1971 the organ was substantially changed to the current size. |
| Germany | Passau Cathedral Organ, Passau, Germany | | 242 stops; 5 manuals; 348 ranks; 19,371 pipes | The world's third largest church organ, is the largest organ in Europe. It is also the largest cathedral organ in the world. All the pipes of the organ can currently be played with the gallery console. |
| Hungary | Szegedi dóm (Cathedral of Our Lady of Hungary) Szeged | Angster, 1928–1932 | 127 stops; 5 manuals; 9,040 pipes | |
| Italy | Duomo di Milano (Milan Cathedral) | Various | 185 stops; 254 ranks; 15,350 pipes | The largest organ in Italy and the second largest in Europe. The organs in this cathedral's history begins in 1395 (the builder was Martino de' Stremidi), and the organs were repeatedly remodeled during subsequent centuries by major Italian builders including Valvassori, Antegnati, Serassi, Tamburini, and Mascioni, as well as some non-Italians such as Bernard d'Allemagna. The golden decoration dates from the 16th century. In 1984 the pipes were reorganized into four cases (north and south) with two consoles |
| Norway | Nidaros Cathedral | G.F. Steinmeyer & Company, Op. 1500, 1929–30; Kuhn Orgelbau, 2013–14 | 129 stops; 4 manuals; 201 ranks; ~10,000 pipes | Originally commissioned for the 900th anniversary of the Battle of Stiklestad. The organ was soon deemed too big for the cathedral, and as such moved and reduced in size several times through its history. It was in a sorry state for years before a full restoration brought it back to its former glory in 2014. The casing and façade was completely rebuilt to seamlessly fit the western portion of the cathedral, and the organ got a brand new console incorporating modern digital technology. However, the new console has been modeled after the original 1930 console layout, and as many as possible of the old pipes were preserved. New pipes were only made where the original pipes had been lost. In 2015 the new Choir Organ was linked together with the Steinmeyer Organ, giving the possibility of playing the combined 159 stops from the same console. However, despite these possibilities, the choir organ still retain its own console for independent use, and the cathedral administration promotes the two organs as independent and separate instruments. |
| Netherlands | Grote or Sint-Laurenskerk (Rotterdam) | Marcussen & Son, 1973 | 84 stops; 4 manuals; 168 ranks; ~7,600 pipes | Said to be the largest purely mechanical organ in Europe. The organ is 23 metres high. |
| Poland | Basilica of Our Lady of Licheń | Zych - Zakłady Organowe, 2002-07 | 157 stops con; 6 manuals; 223 ranks; 12,323 pipes | This organ console is the largest in Poland. The organ has 5 Sections on 5 emporas: 81 stops Symphonic Organ, 52 stops Baroque Organ, 8 stops Spanish Organ, 8 stops Italian Positive Organ, 8 stops Baroque Positive Organ. |
| South Korea | Youn Dong Presbyterian Church, Seoul | | 104 stops; 4 manuals; 119 ranks; 6,820 pipes | This is the largest church organ in Asia. It is the first organ built in Korea by Koreans in the first organ factory. The action is Electro-Pneumatic with Pitman stop action. It is sectioned into 5 Divisions. |
| United Kingdom | Liverpool Cathedral Grand Organ | Henry Willis & Sons | 150 stops; 194 ranks; 10,268 pipes | The builder also built the Royal Albert Hall Organ, the largest concert hall organ in the United Kingdom. |
| United States | Cadet Chapel, United States Military Academy, West Point, New York | M. P. Möller, 1911 | 305 stops; 4 manuals; 375 ranks; 23,500 pipes | The organ is the world's largest pipe organ located in a sacred building. The console has 874 switches for activating the stops, and the action is electro-pneumatic. The instrument is estimated to weigh over 124 tons, and is organized in 23 divisions. It is continually being enlarged. This organ is played for more than 300 services each year. In the history of the Cadet Chapel there have only been four organists. There are public tours of the post and services are open to the public. The Association of Graduates sponsors a concert series free and open to the public. |
| Ukraine | Kharkiv Regional Philharmonic Concert Organ | Alexander Schuke | 72 stops; 4 manuals; 5,700 pipes | The Kharkiv philharmonic concert organ is the largest in Ukraine and the second largest in the territory of the former Soviet Union. |

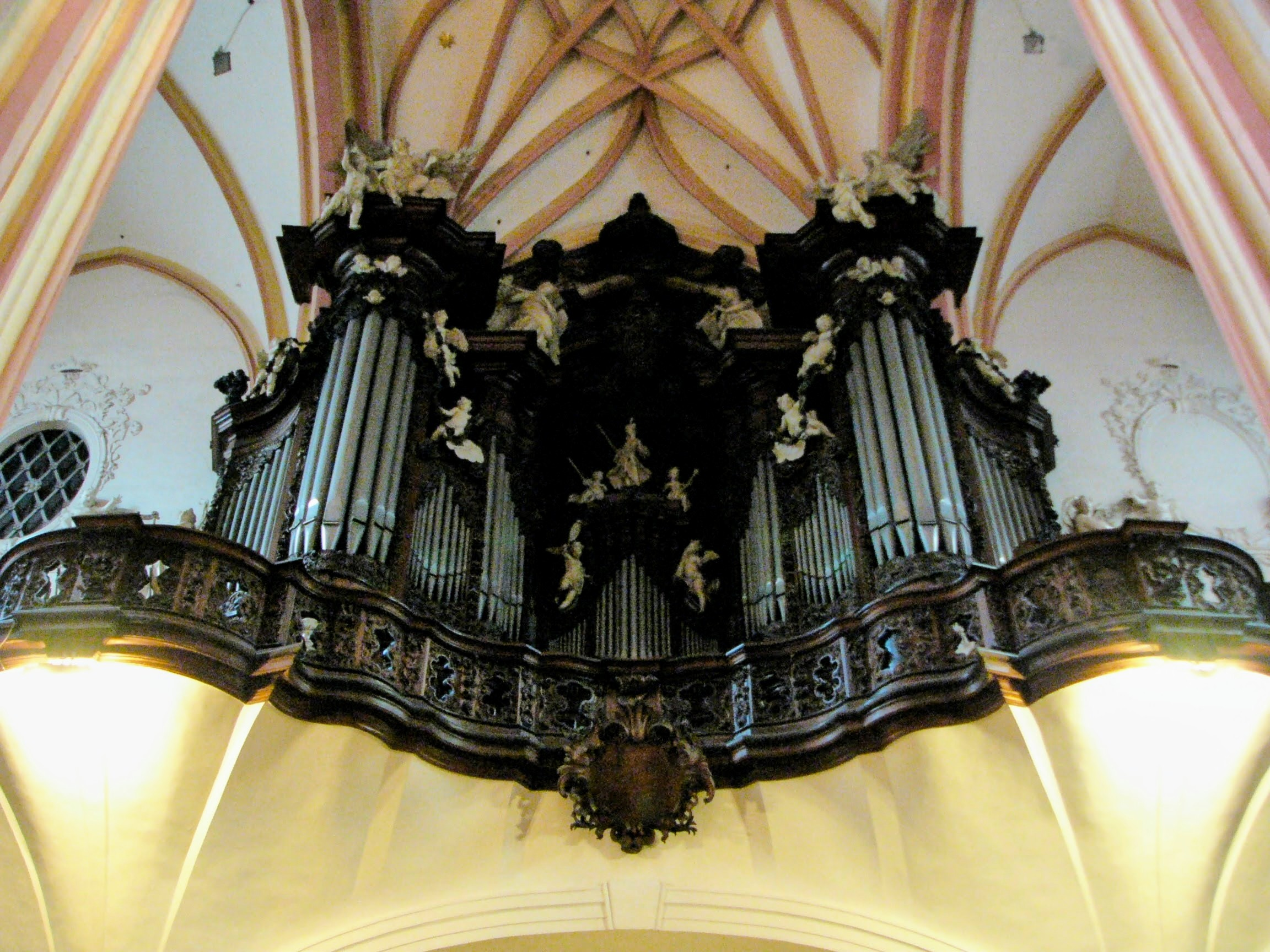
Church of Saint Maurice, Olomouc, Czechia

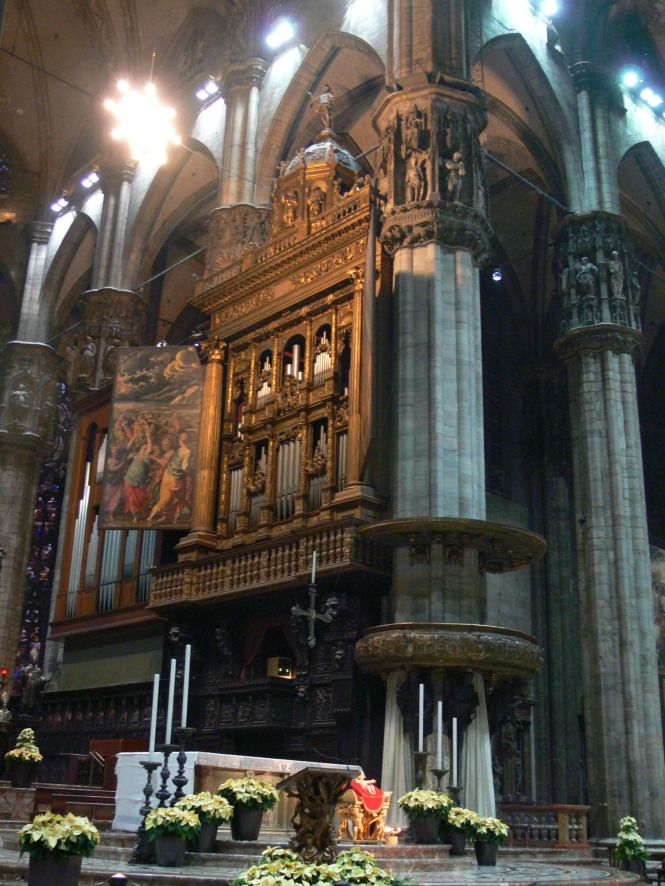
Organ South in Milan Cathedral (1395–1986).

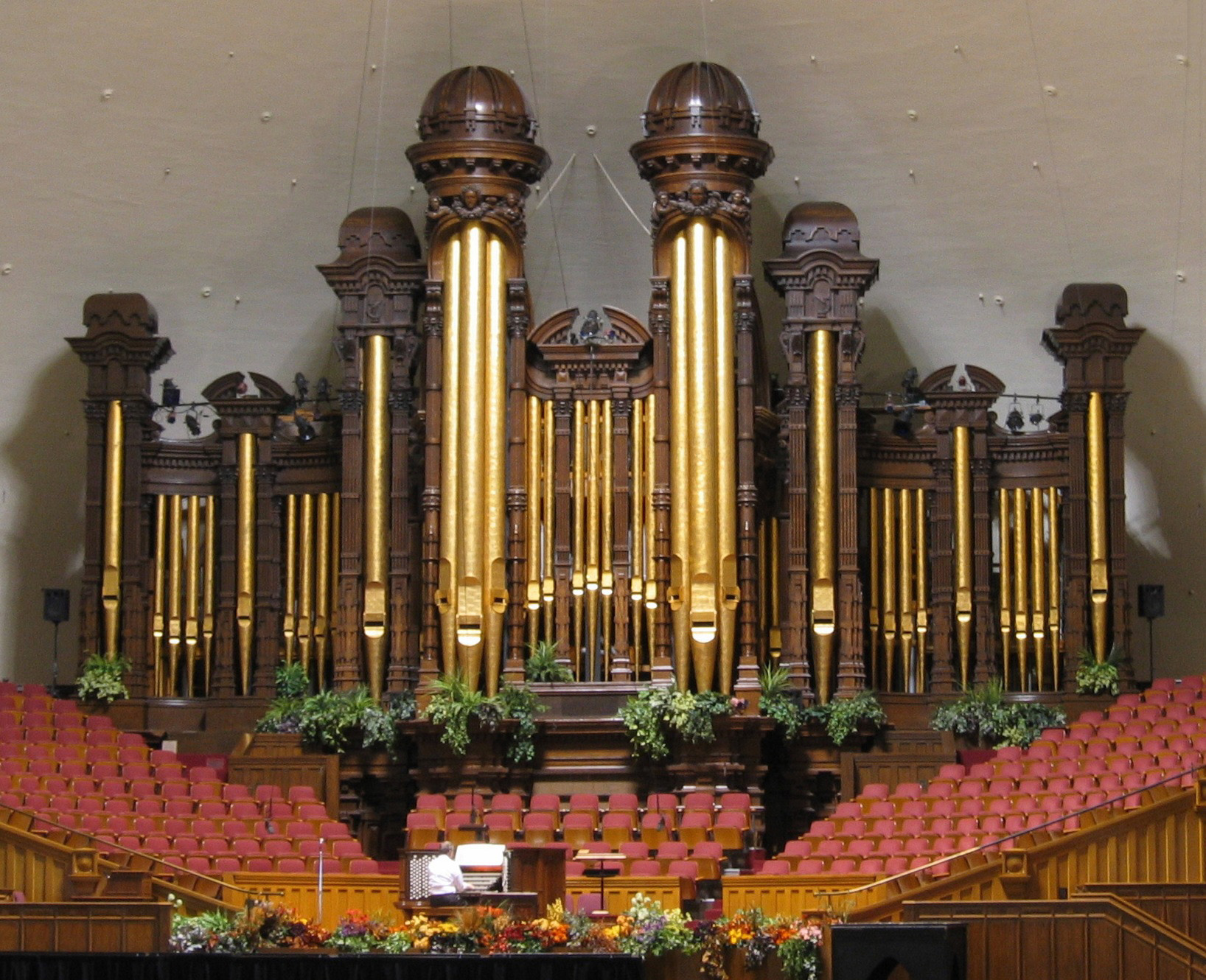
Tabernacle Organ in Salt Lake City, UT

=== Other notable church organs ===
- The world's second largest church organ is at the First Congregational Church of Los Angeles, California. Like Passau Cathedral (five organs, one console), it consists of multiple organs playing from twin consoles. Now known as "The Great Organs at First Church," the instruments were installed over a period of approximately 70 years. As of 2023, The Great Organs at First Church consist of 18,094 speaking pipes, 328 ranks, 15 divisions, and a total of 278 speaking stops:
  - The Seeley Wintersmith Mudd Memorial Organ (Chancel) - The church's original instrument, a Skinner Organ built in 1931, is immediately visible upon entering the Sanctuary, flanking either side of the Chancel.
  - Frank C. Noon Memorial Organ (West Gallery) - In 1969, a Schlicker Organ was installed by Organist in residence, Lloyd Holzgraf. The organ's look and sound "enables the organist to capture the spirit and inspiration of the North German tradition of the 17th century."
  - The Italian Division (Chancel) - A small Italian-style Continuo Organ built by Schlicker, situated adjacent to the South Choir of the Chancel.
  - The Holzgraf Trumpet Royale (Chancel) - These powerful trumpets were installed in 1984, in honor of Mr. Holzgraf's 25th Anniversary at First Church.
  - The Gospel and Epistle Divisions (North and South Transepts) - Under the direction of the famed Frederick Swann, Organist in Residence from 1998 to 2001, William Zeiler completed the installation of Divisions in the North Transept Gallery (Gospel) and the South Transept Gallery (Epistle), so that those attending services and concerts at First Church are now surrounded by music on four sides.

The Moller Consoles were installed during renovations in the early 1990s, replacing the original duplicate Schlicker consoles of 1969 which had become outdated and could no longer fully control the many new additions. The Chancel console, installed in 1992, is known to be one of the last works from the Moller firm, which closed its doors that same year. Its twin, the Gallery console, was completed by former Moller craftsmen at the Hagertown Organ Company. The Moller Consoles are the largest draw-knob consoles ever built in the Western Hemisphere.

- The Salt Lake Tabernacle organ in Utah is among the largest church organs in the United States, built in the American Classic style. Inspired by the design of the Boston Music Hall organ (now in Methuen, Mass.), the original organ was built in 1867 by Joseph Ridges. At that time, the instrument contained some 700 pipes and was constructed of locally derived materials as much as possible. The distinctive casework has become iconic from its association with the famous choir, and is easily recognized around the world. The pipes are constructed of wood, zinc, and various alloys of tin and lead. When it was initially constructed, the organ had a tracker action and was powered by hand-pumped bellows; later it was powered by water from City Creek. Today it is powered by electricity and has an electro-pneumatic action. Though the organ has been rebuilt and enlarged several times since 1867, the original iconic casework and some of Ridges' pipes still remain in the organ today. The current organ is largely the work of G. Donald Harrison of the former Aeolian-Skinner organ firm. It was completed in 1948 and contains 11,623 pipes, 147 speaking stops and 206 ranks.
- Aside from the multiple 100" and 50" wind pressure stops on the Atlantic City Boardwalk Hall Auditorium organ, two of the most powerful organ stops in the world are the State Trumpet on the Great Organ at the Cathedral of St. John the Divine in New York City, and the Trompette Millitaire and Tuba Magna on the organ of Liverpool Anglican Cathedral, UK. Ophicleide (organ stop) These distinctive-sounding stops operate on 50" of wind pressure and are each as loud as an entire large organ played on their own.
- The 1,980-pipe Ferris Tracker organ in Round Lake, New York was originally built in 1847 for Calvary Episcopal Church in New York City. It was moved to the Round Lake Auditorium in 1888, and is considered to be the oldest and largest three-manual organ still intact in the United States.
- The largest mechanical action organ in North America is a 4 Manual, 5 Division, 74 stop instrument, with 6,616 pipes and 126 Ranks. The organ was built by Casavant Frères of St Hyacinthe, Quebec for the Cathedral of Sts. Peter and Paul in Providence, Rhode Island in 1972.
- The Miller-Scott organ at Saint Thomas Church Fifth Avenue, New York, was built in 2018 by Dobson Pipe Organ Builders Ltd. It boasts 7,069 pipes, and is notable for accompanying the world renowned Saint Thomas Choir of Men and Boys. The Miller-Scott organ was an upgrade from the Arents organ, since over many years of aging, it hadn't become able to accompany the choir. This organ contains 4 manuals, 123 registers, 102 stops, and 126 ranks.

== Organs with notable construction methods ==
- The Bamboo Organ at St. Joseph's Roman Catholic Church in Las Piñas, Philippines, some 12 km from downtown Manila, is made almost entirely of bamboo. The building of the organ was begun in 1816 by the Spanish Augustinian Recollect, Fr. Diego Cera de la Virgen del Carmen, and completed in 1824. It has been damaged repeatedly over the years but always restored. After its restoration in 1975 by Johannes Klais (Bonn, Germany), a yearly International Bamboo Organ Festival has been held every year (second half of February).
- The main exhibit in the Ontario Science Centre in Toronto, Ontario is a hydraulophone, a kind of water-jet organ. This pipe organ has hydraulic action provided by three water pumps and the keys on the organ console are water jets, so that each "key" (water jet) affords a richly intricate means to independently control volume, pitch, and timbre affecting each of the organ pipes.
- The 5/80 Wurlitzer Theatre Organ in the residence of Jasper and Marian Sanfilippo of Barrington, Illinois, USA is considered to be the finest example of extension organ in the world today. It is the 3rd largest theatre pipe organ in the world. The 2nd largest theatre pipe organ in the world is in Mesa Arizona at the Organ Stop and the largest theatre pipe organ in the world is the Carma Laboratories organ located in Franklin Wisconsin. The Sanfilippo organ was designed by David Junchen and installed in a purpose-built music room.
- The Organ of the Basilica of St. Martin (Weingarten), Weingarten, Württemberg, Germany, is built around six church windows, with a detached console facing the church. The tracker action is entirely mechanical, sometimes spanning as much as 20 metres, and going around several corners. It was built by Joseph Gabler during 1713 - 1750.

== Other organs ==
- Old Salem in Winston-Salem North Carolina has a Tannenberg Organ that was originally built in the 18th century. The case was built in Salem and the other parts were built in Lititz. Tannenberg was 72 at the time of the organ's construction, and was not able to make the trip to Salem to install it. The installation was done by George Currie of Philadelphia. Restoration of the organ has been made several times. One undertaking, in 1910, was not satisfactory, and in 2004 an extensive restoration was completed in Staunton, Va. It was then moved into the Visitor Center, where it is played by the music director of the museum. A tour of the bellows is available to visitors.

== See also ==
- List of pipe organ builders
- Organ Historical Society
