= Ophicleide (organ stop) =

Organ stop

Ophicleide (/ˈɒfɪklaɪd/ OFF-ih-klyde) and Contra Ophicleide are powerful pipe organ reed pipes used as organ stops. The name comes from the early brass instrument, the ophicleide, forerunner of the euphonium.

The Ophicleide is generally at 16 ft pitch, and the Contra Ophicleide at 32 ft. While they can be 8 ft or 16 ft reeds in a manual division, they are most commonly found in the pedal division of the organ. Voiced to develop both maximum fundamental tone (as in the Bombarde) and overtone series (as in the Posaune), if the classic voicing technique and use of terminology are followed, the Ophicleide and Contra Ophicleide are among the most powerful and loudest organ stops. Generally the only types of stop more powerful are the various forms of Trompette en chamade. However, the Ophicleides require an extremely large instrument to balance their sound, and so are rarely built today, except into the largest of organs (about one hundred ranks and up).

The Grand Ophicleide in the Boardwalk Hall Organ, Atlantic City, New Jersey, is recognized as the loudest organ stop in the world, voiced on 100" wind pressure (0.25 bar). Its tone is described by Guinness World Records as having "a pure trumpet note of ear-splitting volume, more than six times the volume of the loudest locomotive whistle."

== See also ==
- List of pipe organ stops
