= Abbatial church of Notre-Dame de Mouzon =

Church of the monastery of Mouzon in France

Coordinates: 49.6054°N 5.0758°E

- Abbatiale Notre-Dame de Mouzon
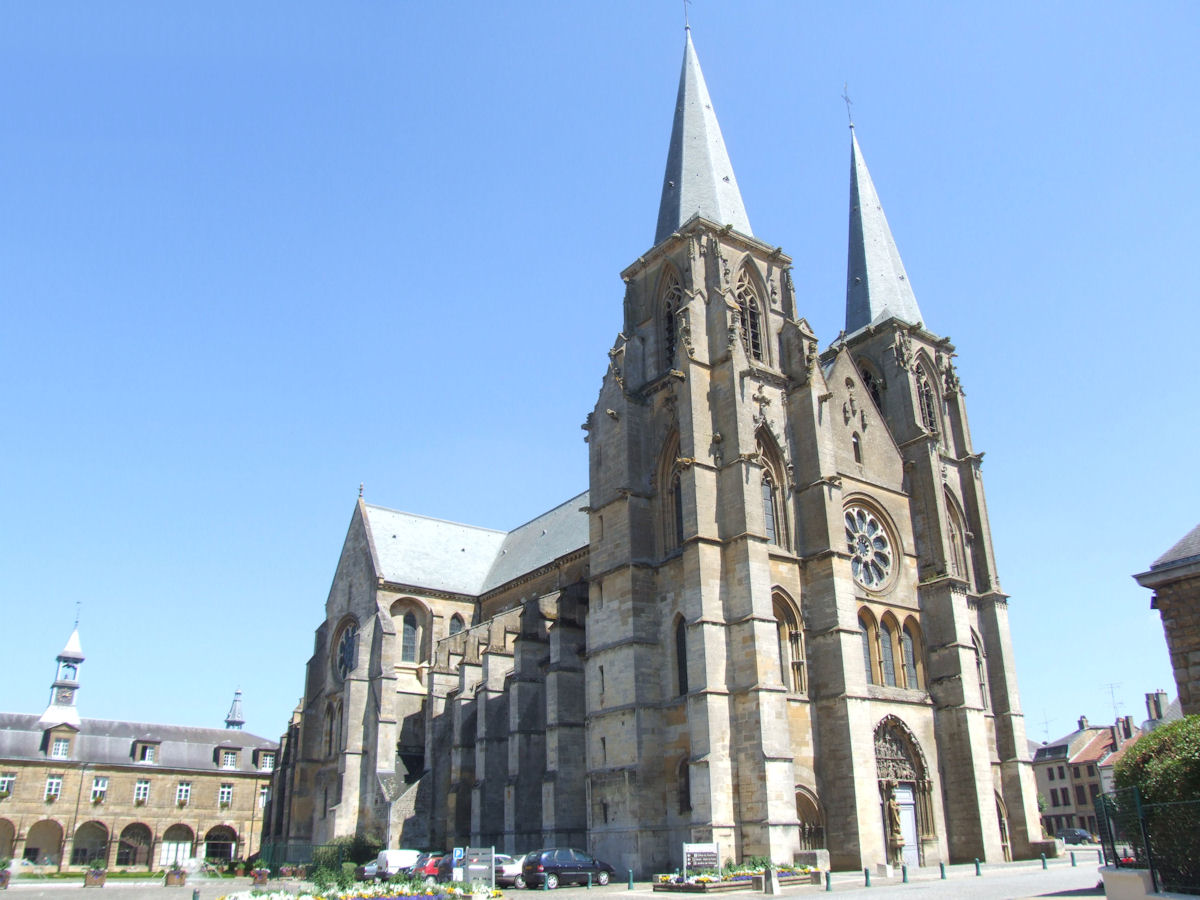
- General view of the exterior

General information
- Type: Abbatial church
- Architectural style: Gothic
- Location: Mouzon, France
- Year built: 12th century
- Groundbreaking: 1840

Design and construction
- Designations: Roman Catholic worship

The abbatial church of Notre-Dame de Mouzon is the ancient church of the monastery of Mouzon, in the Ardennes region of France.

The evolution of this abbatial church in the Middle Ages is linked to the relics housed here, notably those of Saint Victor and Saint Arnoul. These relics became sources of material income as they were objects of ostentatious worship. The influx of pilgrims led to the construction of this building in the 11th and 13th centuries, inspired by the early Gothic style, but already heralding a second generation through certain technical choices. The relatively small size of the site, compared with the stone vessels of the great cathedrals, means that visitors can easily take in the entire church envelope, with differences in light intensity giving relief to the architectural elements and religious furnishings. The presence of a recluse just a few meters from the abbatial's choir also bears witness to the diversity of religious life in the West at the time.

In the early 18th century, Christophe Moucherel installed an organ and a Baroque-style high altar. During the French Revolution, the building was preserved by the commune, despite the dissolution of the monastic community, and became the parish church.

However, the church has suffered from disaffection and lack of maintenance, making it vulnerable. However, it was classified as a historic monument as soon as the first list of monuments protected in this way, the 1840 list, was issued. Between 1855 and 1890, it underwent a major restoration campaign. The work, requested by Prosper Mérimée, was led by architect Émile Boeswillwald. The building was saved. However, the western facade was radically altered.

== History ==
As early as the 6th century, the city of Mouzon had several churches attached to the diocese of Reims: Saint-Martin within the city walls and Saint-Pierre and Sainte-Geneviève extra muros.

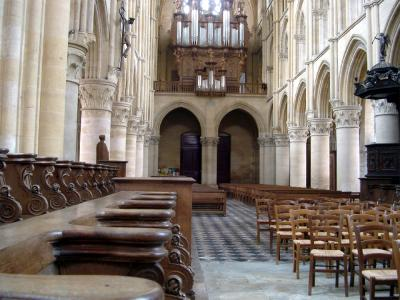
abbatial churchnave.

In the 9th century, a church of Notre Dame was founded within the first monastic establishment, bringing together Benedictine nuns. In the last years of the episcopate of Hincmar, the relics of Saint Victor were discovered nearby. However, this same period was troubled by conflicts and invasions, notably in 882 by the Vikings, who went up the Meuse, ruining the city, devastating the ecclesiastical buildings, and provoking the departure of the nuns.

A new archbishop, Herivée, restored Mouzon's walls and religious buildings between 900 and 920. He installed a college of canons there and entrusted them with the relics of Saint Victor. In 971, Adalberon, Archbishop of Rheims, dissatisfied with this community of canons living in a particular disorder, re-established a monastery with the help of Benedictine monks coming from Thin-le-Moutier, who also replaced the church of Notre Dame, the chapter of canons. This reform was carried out rapidly. The relics of Saint Arnoul, a pilgrim murdered in the 8th century, were entrusted to this new community, adding to those of Saint Victor. These saints were lay people who could respond to a famous aspiration to holiness.

With the influx of pilgrims coming to venerate the relics, the abbatial church became too small. At the same time, there was a general trend towards enlarging church choirs to provide a more spacious setting for a liturgy called for greater pomp. This movement affected abbatial churches such as Saint-Rémi in Reims, Vézelay and Saint-Germain des Prés. The project to build a new choir and the entire eastern part of the church was launched in the early 1190s, taking into account innovative architectural approaches implemented as early as 1130 by Suger for the abbatial church of Saint-Denis. In addition to this project, another ambition led to the expansion of the clergy area in the existing church: in the same years, Archbishop Guillaume aux Blanches Mains of Rheims was planning to divide the diocese of Rheims by creating a bishopric in Mouzon. Mouzon was the second-largest city in the diocese, ahead of Mézières, Rethel, Attigny, Rumigny, Épernay, etc., and the conversion of the abbatial churchchurch into a cathedral would have been a highly suitable solution.

To enlarge the existing church, the choir was demolished and rebuilt according to Parisian or Laonnais models, in the style that would later be called Primitive Gothic. The project for a new diocese, although approved by Pope Celestine III and later by his successor Innocent III, was finally abandoned by the archbishop of Rémois a few years later, in the late 1190s, even though this first stage in the transformation of Mouzon abbatial churchchurch had come to fruition.

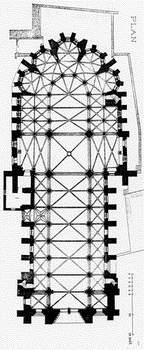
Plan of the building from 1855, before restoration, by E. Boeswillwald.

It is challenging to know whether it was initially planned to extend the work and rebuild a transept and nave in continuity with the chevet and choir. However in 1212, a fire broke out, sparing the new part for the most part but making it necessary to rebuild the old parts. This second stage of construction of the present abbatial church continued until the middle of the 13th century, remaining in the same style and proportions as the choir. The upper part of the two towers, on the other hand, dates from the 16th century, while maintaining the same style. In 1515, however, windows of flamboyant style were added to the choir's lighting, in addition to the flamboyant galls roof installed above the tympanum of the western portal in the previous century.

The additions in the 17th and 18th centuries focused more on interior fittings and religious furnishings. In 1725, the organ was installed, built by Christophe Moucherel, and initially placed in the north transept. Finally, in April 1728, the Master Altar was consecrated.

In 1789, the French Revolution made the abbey's property available to the Nation by decree on 2 November. Concerning the real estate, the farms and mills were auctioned off as national property. However, the municipality of Mouzon saved the essentials by reserving the cloister for the use of the elderly and the sick and changing the use abbatial church. This municipality indeed submitted a request to the Director du Département asking that the abbatial church become the parish church, thus sacrificing the old parish church to the demolishers. When the civil constitution of the clergy was decreed in August 1790 and a short-lived diocese of the Ardennes, distinct from the diocese of Reims, was created, the same municipality hoped for a few weeks that Mouzon would be erected as the seat of this new diocese and that the former abbatial church would become the diocesan church, but the State chose Sedan. In 1793, during the Terreur, worship was interrupted, the building was transformed into a Temple of Reason, and some sculptures were vandalized. The authorization of the Constitutional Cult was re-established in 1795, and the religious situation was definitively stabilized by the Concordat of 1801. In 1807, lightning struck the church. Lacking maintenance and with cracks in its fabric, the building underwent a major restoration campaign from 1855 to 1890. It was classified as a historical monument from the liste de 1840.

In 1932, the Commission of Historical Monuments rejected stained glass projects. In retrospect, such an initiative would have proved futile since 1940 shells fell on the abbatial church, shattering the existing windows and stained glass. One shell damaged the rose window illuminating the southern part of the transept, and another tore through the vault, requiring some reparation. The stained glass windows were replaced by white glass or sober stained-glass windows with simple geometrical patterns.

== General architecture ==
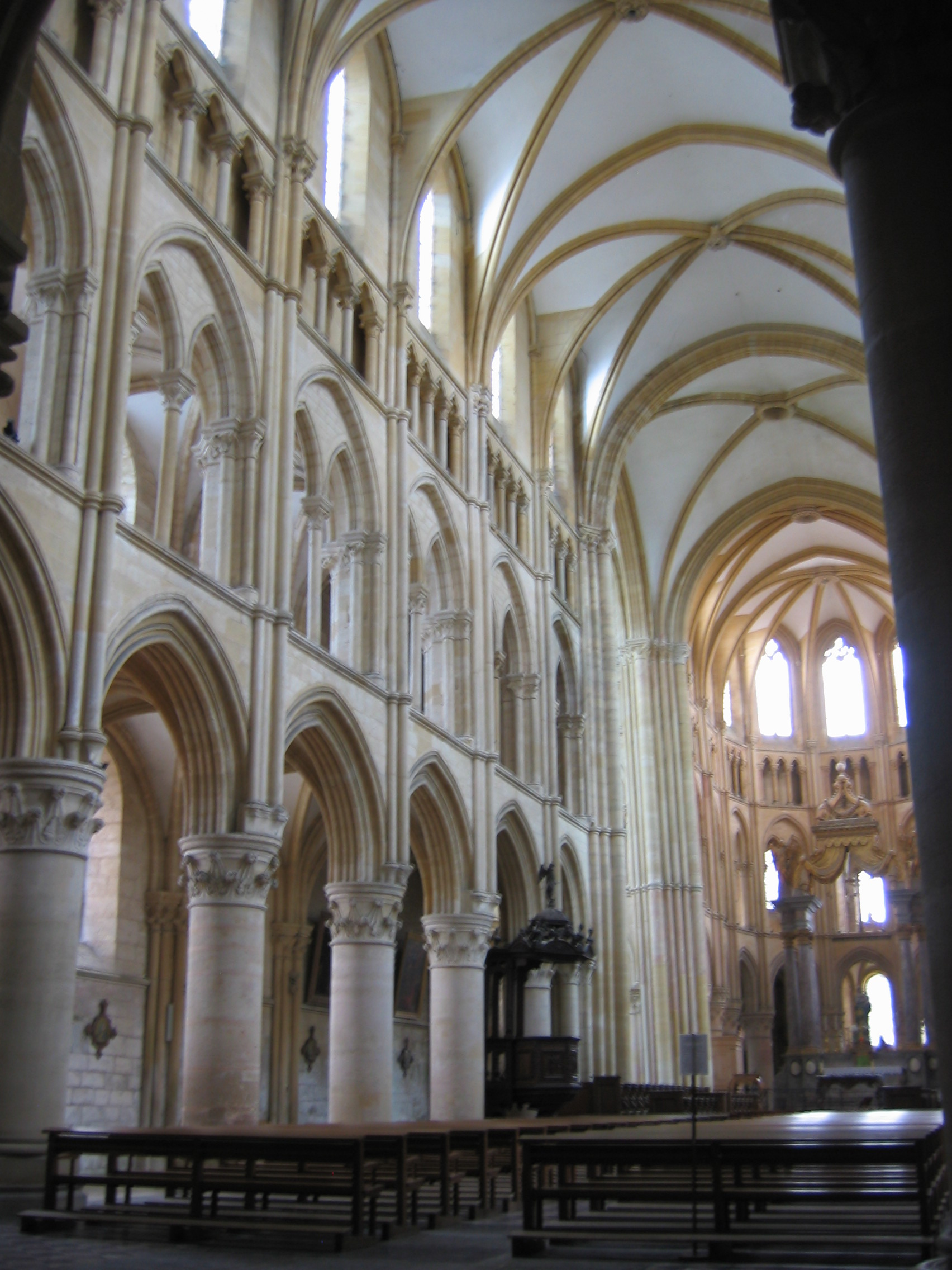
The elevation of the nave.

The nave, surrounded by two collaterals, gives itself up to the visitor's gaze as soon as he enters, with its three-story elevation, characteristic of the Primitive Gothic style. The lower level features large pointed-arch arches supported by round pillars with circular carvings. The second floor consists of tribunes, inherited from the Romanesque style, which opens with double arches under a relieving arch with tiers-point. The second floor is a triforium, a passage that goes around the building, characteristic of Gothic architecture, topped again by a third floor of large windows. On the exterior, the flying buttresses, a recent technique at the time of construction, contribute to the solidity of the building. Five radiating chapels surround the choir and open onto a five-sided ambulatory, giving this part of the church a specific size.

Despite the length of time between the beginning of the construction of the chevet and the choir and the end of the rebuilding of the transept and the nave, the style within the abbatial church is relatively homogeneous. The building is vaulted on ribbed crossings, with sexpartite vaults in the middle and quadripartite vaults in the choir.

For example, no crypt from an earlier church has been identified. The mobility and humidity of the soil could have prevented its construction.

== Tympanum ==
Two square towers surround the portal. The portal's tympanum, dating from the 13th century, is composed of three levels of sculpted decoration, separated by wavy bands, evoking, in medieval symbolism, the sky. The second floor depicts, on the left, the dormition of Christ's mother, and, on the right, the martyrdom of Victor de Mouzon and Arnoul de Mouzon. The middle floor is devoted to three scenes from the iconographic tradition on the life of the Virgin Mary. On the left is the Visitation of the Virgin Mary, or visit that Mary, pregnant with Christ, would have made to her cousin Elizabeth, pregnant with John the Baptist. In the middle, the crowning of the Virgin, an episode unknown in the gospels according to Matthew, Mark, Luke, or John, but popular in the 12th and 13th centuries. This scene, relatively new in religious iconography, can also be found in the sculpted decoration of the tympanums of the cathedrals of Chartres, Senlis, Paris, and Laon. And on the right is the Annunciation, or announcement to Mary of her divine maternity by the Archangel Gabriel. The third floor, or upper floor, consists of kneeling angels. This is the area of the tympanum where the carvings have been most damaged, introducing more uncertainty about the interpretation. A figure seems to be pushed by an angel toward a divine being, perhaps God the Father, or Christ, to whom another angel holds out a crown. The figure thus presented to God for glorification could again be Victor, the martyr and patron saint of Mouzon.

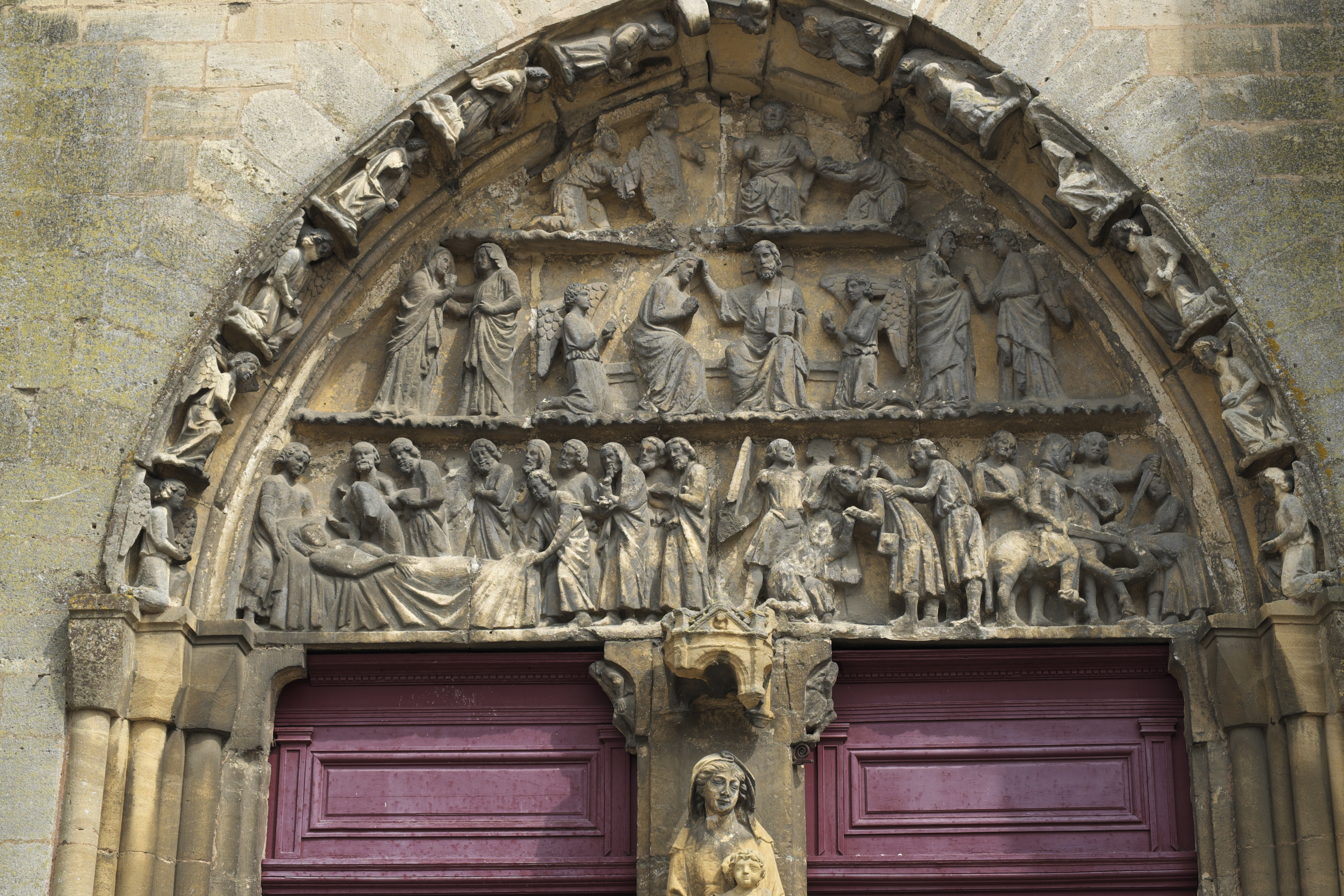
The tympanum.

The whole is part of a balanced composition, contributing to its legibility. The scenes follow one another without interfering. The proportions are natural, except for the horse. The modeling and the relief are well rendered. Some liberties are taken concerning a very coded religious iconography, such as placing the angel on the left and the Mother of Jesus on the right in the Annunciation scene. The figures no longer have the stiffness and hieraticism of the first Gothic works, even if the artist does not rank with the best sculptors of his time if there are still some clumsinesses in articulating the limbs, for example, and if the general inspiration needs more vigor. The central scene of Christ's crowning of the Virgin Mary is one of the simplest and successful.

At its construction, the tympanum was protected by several rows of voussures. Only one row remains, where twelve figures of angels have been reinstalled. A statue of the 'Virgin and Child' is installed in the overmantel. The statues that stood at the right feet have disappeared.

== Some dimensions ==
The total length is 65 m. The nave is 9 m wide in the central aisle, 4.20 m wide in the south aisle, and 4 m wide in the north aisle. The nave elevation is 21 m. The transept is relatively small, with an east–west width of 9.80 m. Its length is 26.05 m. The choir and apse are 14.50 m deep, and the radiating chapels are 4 m deep, except for the chapel in the axis, which is 5 m deep. The ambulatory is 3.60 m wide. The façade towers rise to 56.50 m, including the spire.

The dimensions of this abbatial church are close to those of Senlis Cathedral and considerably smaller than other cathedrals built at the same time in the northern part of the kingdom, such as Laon, Reims, and Noyon.

== Place of the church in the architecture of its time ==
The construction choices of the abbatial church are essentially in line with the first Gothic buildings, notably the four-storey nave (as in Noyon and Laon), the existence of tribunes, the tri-lobed arches of the triforium (as in Noyon) and the mono-cylindrical pillars of the lower storey (as in Laon and Notre-Dame de Paris Cathedral).

New elements, heralding a second generation of Gothic buildings, nevertheless appear in this tower. These include, in particular, the flying buttresses planned from the outset, buttressing the vaults around the choir and along the nave. The shape of these first buttresses is still quite heavy, their heads abutting at a level that is not yet very high, and they are supported by abutments or buttresses that thicken from top to bottom. Nevertheless, these are among the earliest examples of buttresses built into a building from the outset. In the case of Mouzon, they add to, rather than replace, the traditional buttress wall mounted on the extrados of the tribune doubleaux.

In the Gothic buildings that followed the 13th century, the buttresses became progressively more refined and slender and were also used for water drainage. The implementation of this increasingly effective counter-balance to the vaults resulted in an upward stretching of the forms inside the churches, with the disappearance of the tribunes and the four-level elevations found at Mouzon further reinforcing the impression of an upward spurt. Monocylindrical pillars also evolved into fasciculated pillars in later buildings in the 13th century. Also, in Mouzon, the south-side nave's flying buttresses were redesigned in the 15th century, with pinnacles that did not exist on the north side.

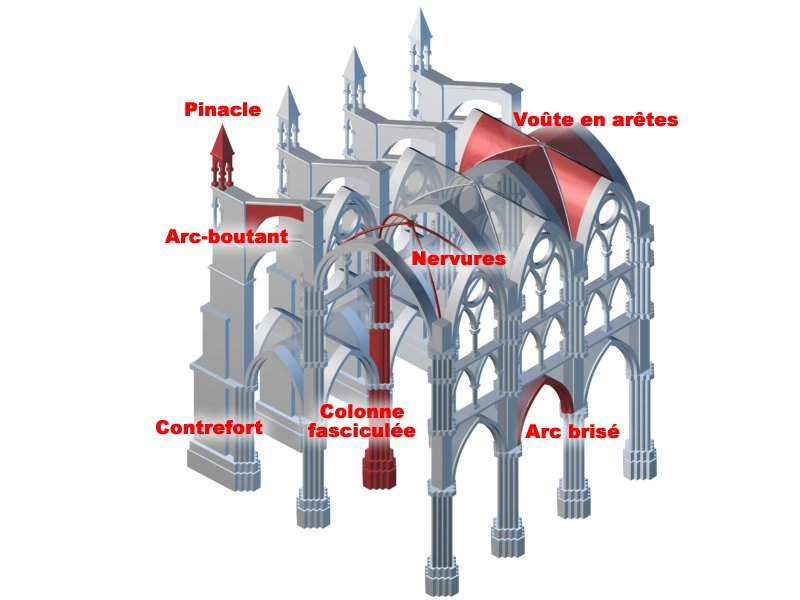
Vocabulary of Gothic architecture.

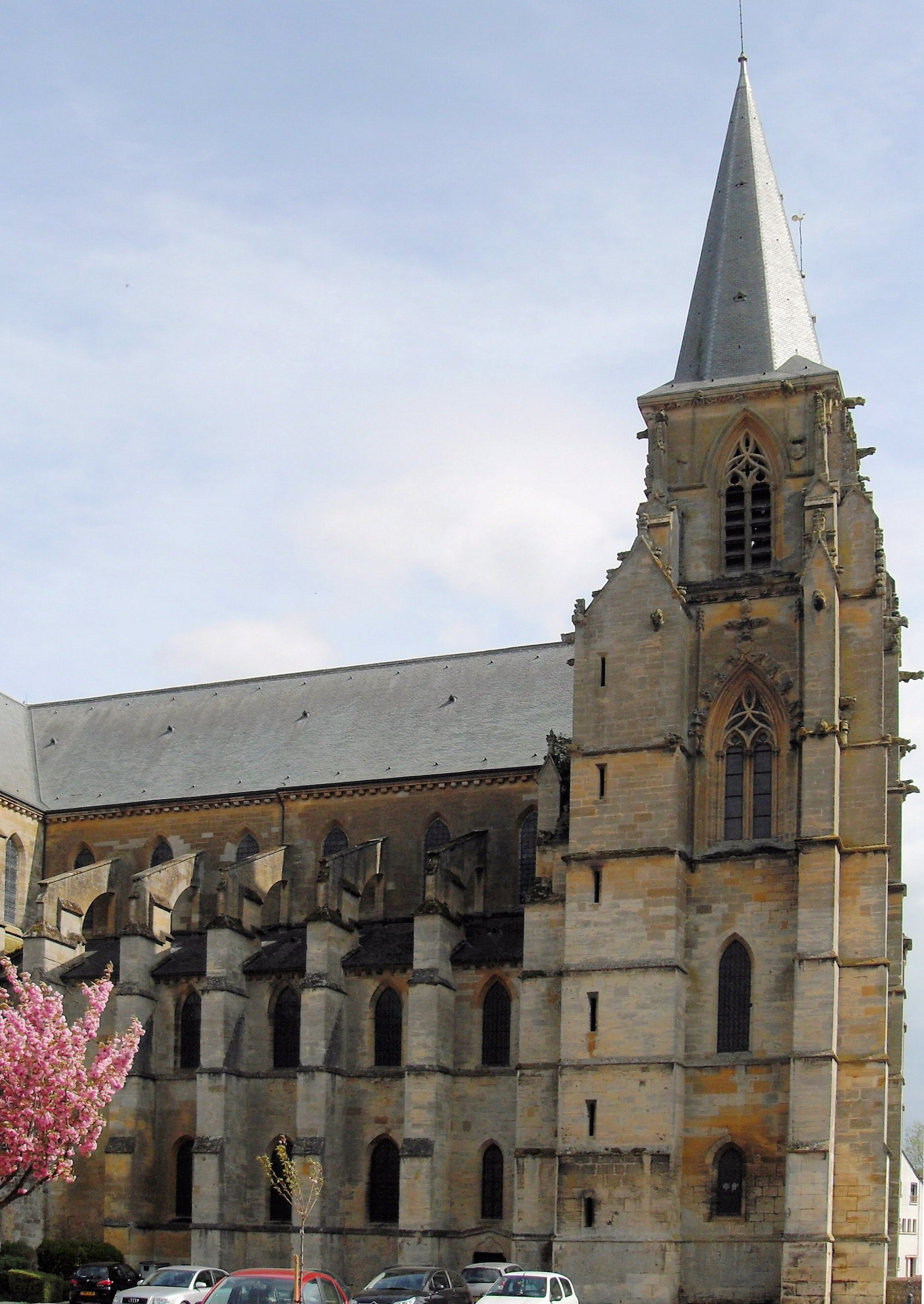
North nave buttresses, without pinnacle.

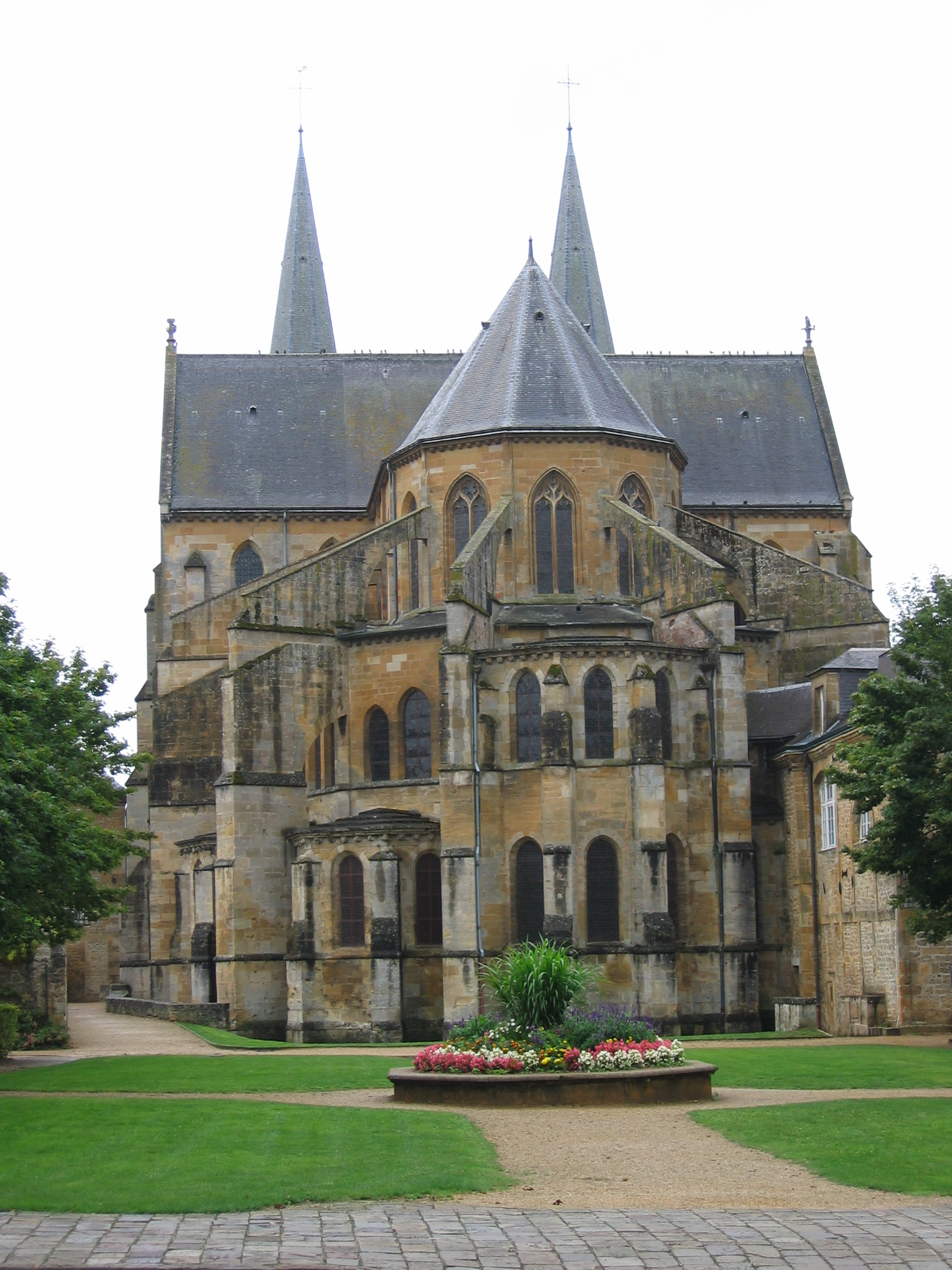
Buttresses around the choir.

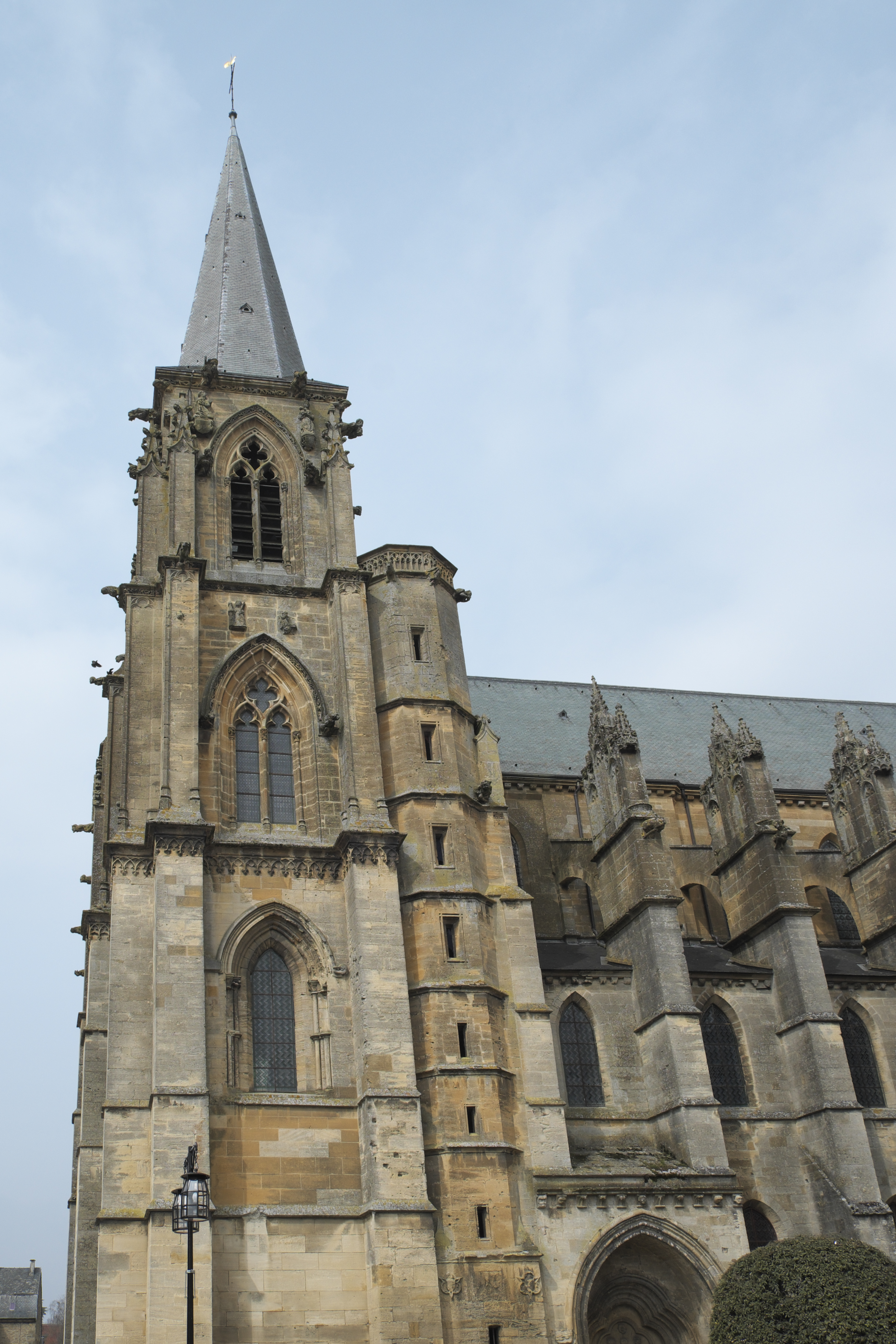
South nave buttresses with pinnacles.

== Impact of the 19th-century restoration ==
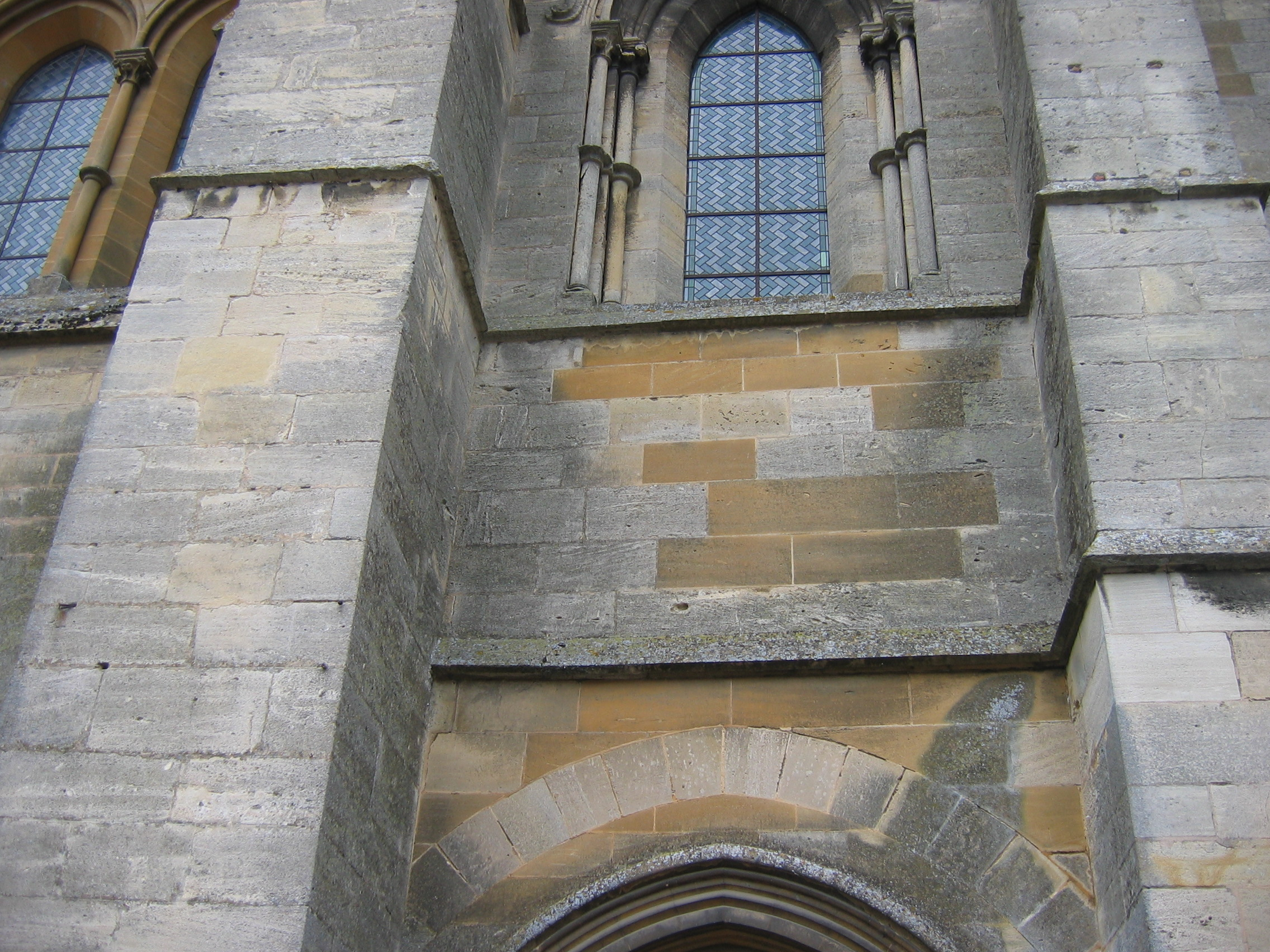
Difference in hue between stones, following restoration.

At the request of Prosper Mérimée, Inspector of Historical Monuments, a restoration project was presented by architect Émile Boeswillwald on 10 January 1855 on a building deeply weakened by the years. Four phases of work were required to complete the restoration, from 1867 to 1890, at an estimated total cost of nearly 600 000 golden francs. The stone quarried in Bulson is more yellow than the original, which came from the Yoncq quarries. This difference in color makes it possible to distinguish the parts rebuilt in the 19th century using original and new stone.

The western facade, which was in a deplorable state of repair before the restoration, was rebuilt. In particular, a significant flamboyant skylight above the tympanum in the 15th century was replaced by four windows topped by a rosace, inspired by the north and south gables of the transept. Boeswillwald thus substitutes a simpler, more solid structure for a weakened portal structure. But he probably also yielded to the doctrine of stylistic unity dear to the school of Eugène Viollet-le-Duc by doing away with this fambloyant addition, artificially accentuating the abbatial church's homogeneity.

"Restoring a tower is not maintaining it, repairing it, or remaking it; it's restoring it to a complete state that may never have existed at a given moment."

— Viollet-le-Duc.

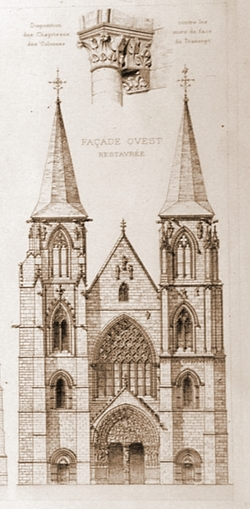
West facade before restoration.

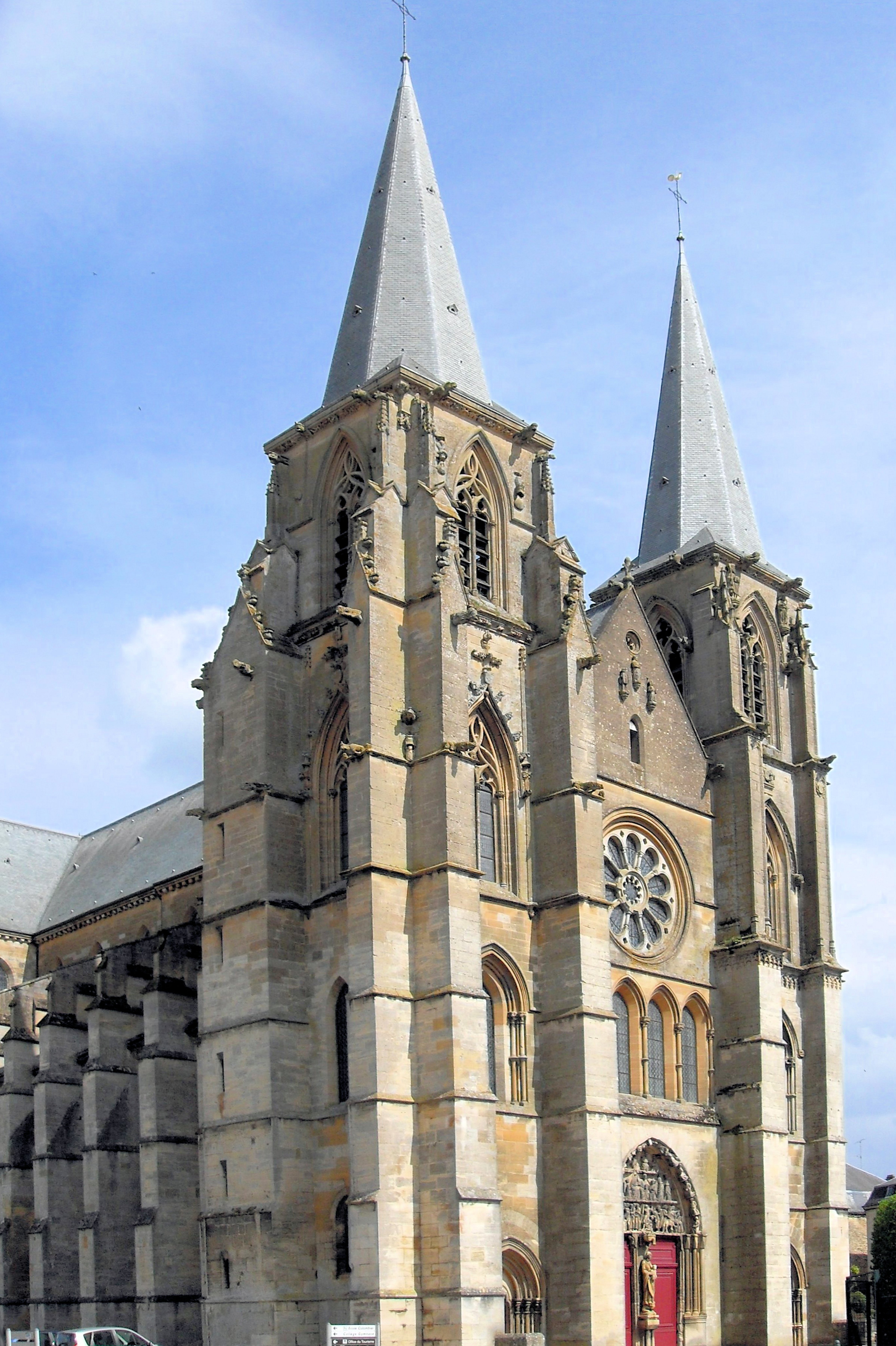
West facade today.

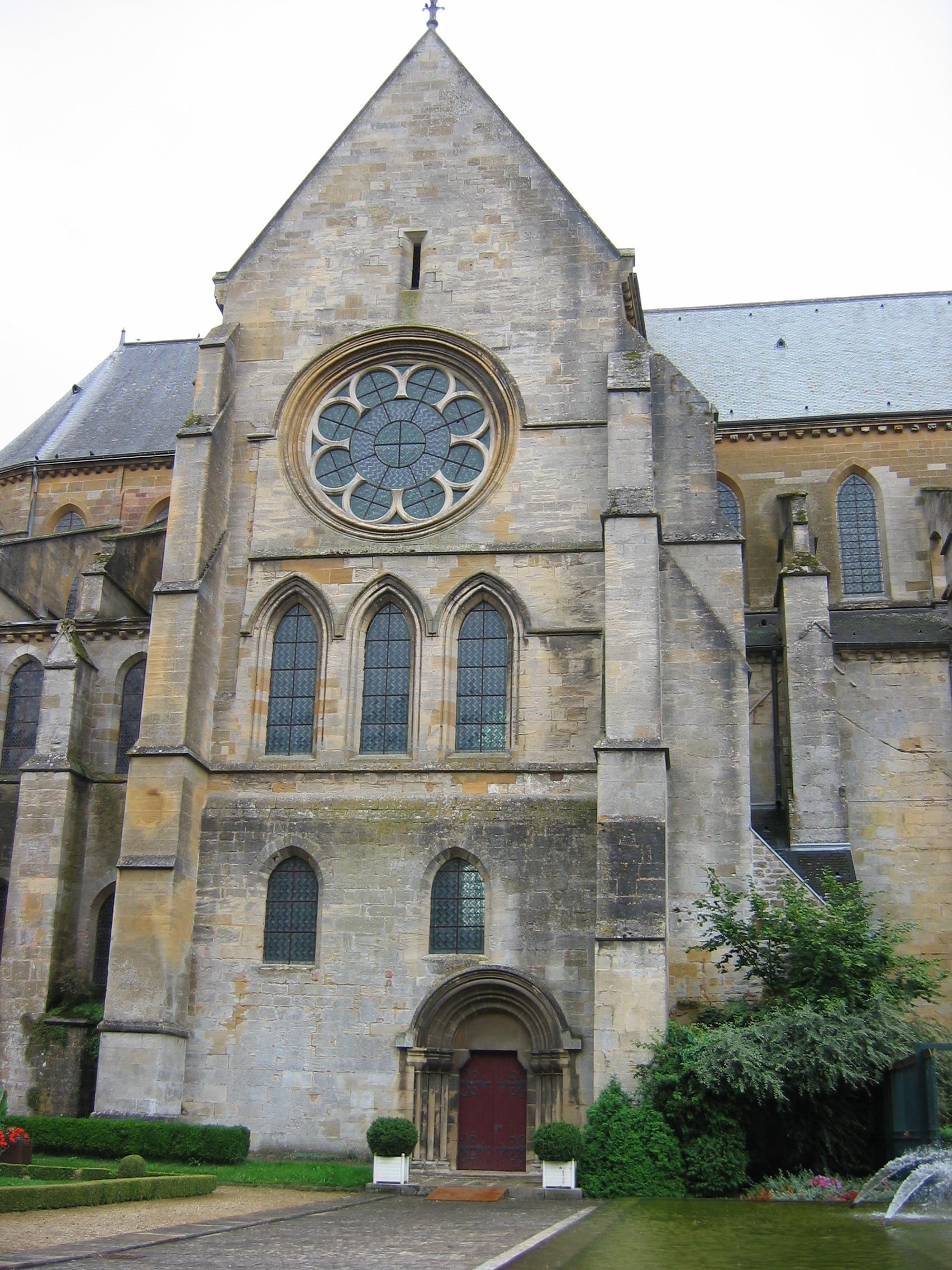
North gable.

The upper part of the wall on the north side of the building (in front of the monastery) was also rebuilt, as the seven high bays with their windows as well as the corresponding buttresses. The same applies to the south side. The top of the choir was replaced in the same way, as were the chevet buttresses. Inside, a 15th-century chapel, also in the flamboyant style, has been removed from the north side aisle. This was the only chapel added to the original construction in the Middle Ages. Columns were partially rebuilt. Three stained-glass windows in the choir were dismantled to preserve them during the work but were not found when they were back in place. A gallery is added at the back of the church, towards the western portal, to support the great organ.

== Reclusoir ==
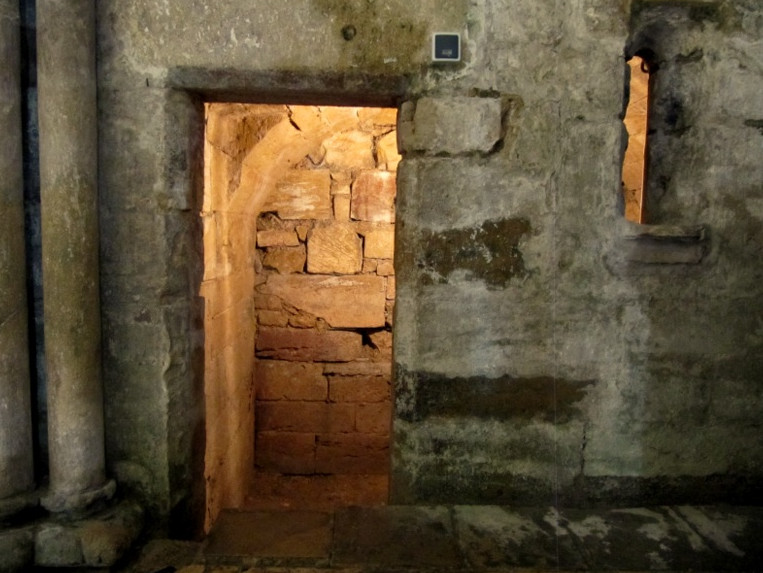
Photography of a dark part of the church: you can see a passage in the thickness of the wall and a slit.

One of the unique features of the Mouzon abbatial church is the existence of a reclusoir in a chapel to the left of the abbatial choir and high altar. This unusual feature highlights one aspect of religious life in the Middle Ages. It consists on a slightly vaulted cell measuring 2.1 m by 1.1 m and 2.1 m high, with a door designed to be bricked up and a small opening 60 cm tall and a few centimeters wide, allowing a glimpse of the nearby altar and high altar. This cell, located in the north ambulatory, was intended for the use of a voluntary recluse, a person wishing to live in solitude a tête-à-tête with God, while being in the heart of the city.

At least two recluses are attested on this site, including Mathilde, Dame de Villemontry, in 1197. She wanted to imitate "her son, who had taken the monastic habit at Mouzon abbatial church and decided to live as a recluse." This choice of lifestyle was not specific to Mouzon at that time, and, along with the hermits, was a familiar figure in European society, even if it had a lesser influence and a much more discreet trace in the written word than the great monastic communities.

== Religious furnishings ==
The carved wooden preaching pulpit in the nave is a work of the 17th century by local craftsman André Lefèvre. It came from the former parish church of Saint-Martin and was installed in this building in March 1792. The hexagonal bowl of the pulpit is decorated with finely carved rinceaux, and the four sides facing the nave depict the four Evangelists, standing, dressed in abundantly pleated cloaks, with their traditional symbolic attributes. The abat-voix is adorned with small arched spandrels, fire pots linked by garlands and a pedestal surmounted by an angel wielding a trumpet.

In the transept square, they were partly extending into the nave, 26 stalls are low, and many tall oak stalls are arranged, dating from the second half of the 17th century to the first half of the 18th century. They are simple, in a sober style, with carved mercy seats decorated with acanthus leaves.

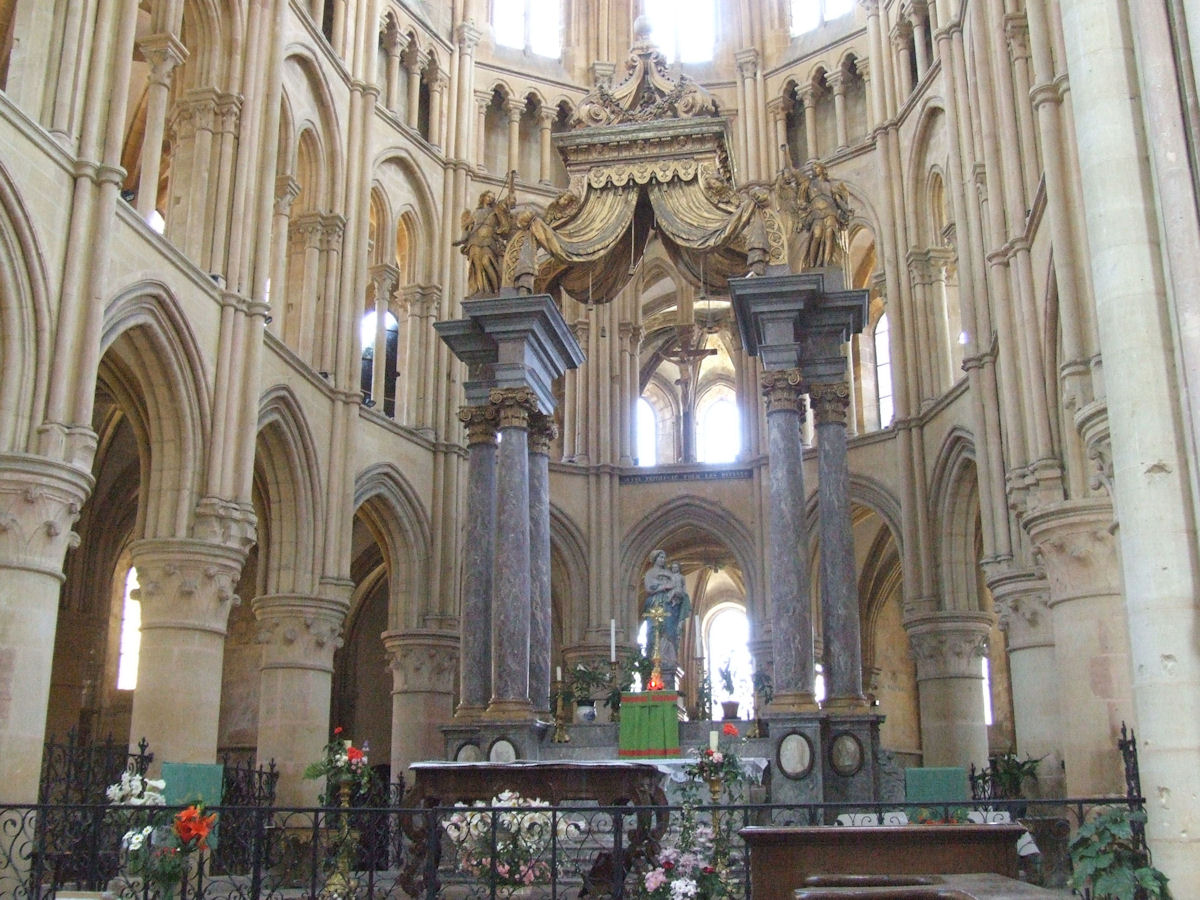
The high altar and crucifix in the background

The choir of the church features a remarkable monumental main altar in Baroque style, consecrated in 1728. The altar's base is adorned with four oval medallions, with four heads sculpted in bas-relief in a stucco. Depicted are Jesus Christ, the Virgin Mary, saint Benedict and Saint Scholastica. Three marble columns on each side of this base stand in a triangle on high stylobates. The columns are surmounted by entablatures, with a décor of angels flanking a rectangular canopy, from which draperies fall at all four ends. At the top of this ornamental arrangement, scrolled consoles are embellished with garlands and a globe cruciferous. The whole is very similar to the high altar of the Cathedral Saint-Étienne de Châlons, dating from 1686, and therefore earlier than.

A crucifix (originally a calvary) stands out in the light from the tribune's axis bay, appearing above the altar, seemingly hovering in the canopy's draperies. At this point in the gallery, on the upper floor, is a chapel, lit by five windows and dedicated to Saint Thomas of Canterbury, the object of popular and ecclesiastical veneration when the church was built. The crucifix probably dates from the same period as the altar.

The radiating chapels around the choir feature various pieces of furniture, altars, retables, washbasins, paintings, and statues. Notable among these is a wooden statue, unfortunately, mutilated, of Madeleine elegantly dressed in a low-cut dress and cloak. Its author is unknown, but the style is 18th century. Also in the ambulatory is a painting by Theodoor van Thulden, Jésus apparaissant à Madeleine. Several gravestones of clerics and clerical officers are set in the church pavement or against the aisle wall of the nave. Curiously, there are no tombs of the abbots of the Mouzon monastery, except for a commendatory abbot, Claude de Joyeuse, who died in 1710, and Jean Gilmer.

== Organ ==
The organ builder Christophe Moucherel had been asked to complete the Stenay organ, whose case had been built by Jean Boizard of Sedan, before his accidental death. When the instrument was finally delivered on 13 March 1719, he met Dom Amand Vincent, father organist at Mouzon Abbey, who was one of the experts. The latter, given the work done at Stenay, recommended him for the construction of a similar instrument at the abbatial churchchurch. Construction began in 1723 and was completed in 1725. The decor is by sculptor Jacques Lemaire, including a Virgin and Child topping the central turret of the grand buffet, assisted by Stenay carpenter Henri Baillard.

In 1790, 'an organ set' was mentioned in the inventory of the abbey's possessions. The instrument survived the lightning strike of 1807, which pierced the roof, as well as various "repairs" during the 19th century.

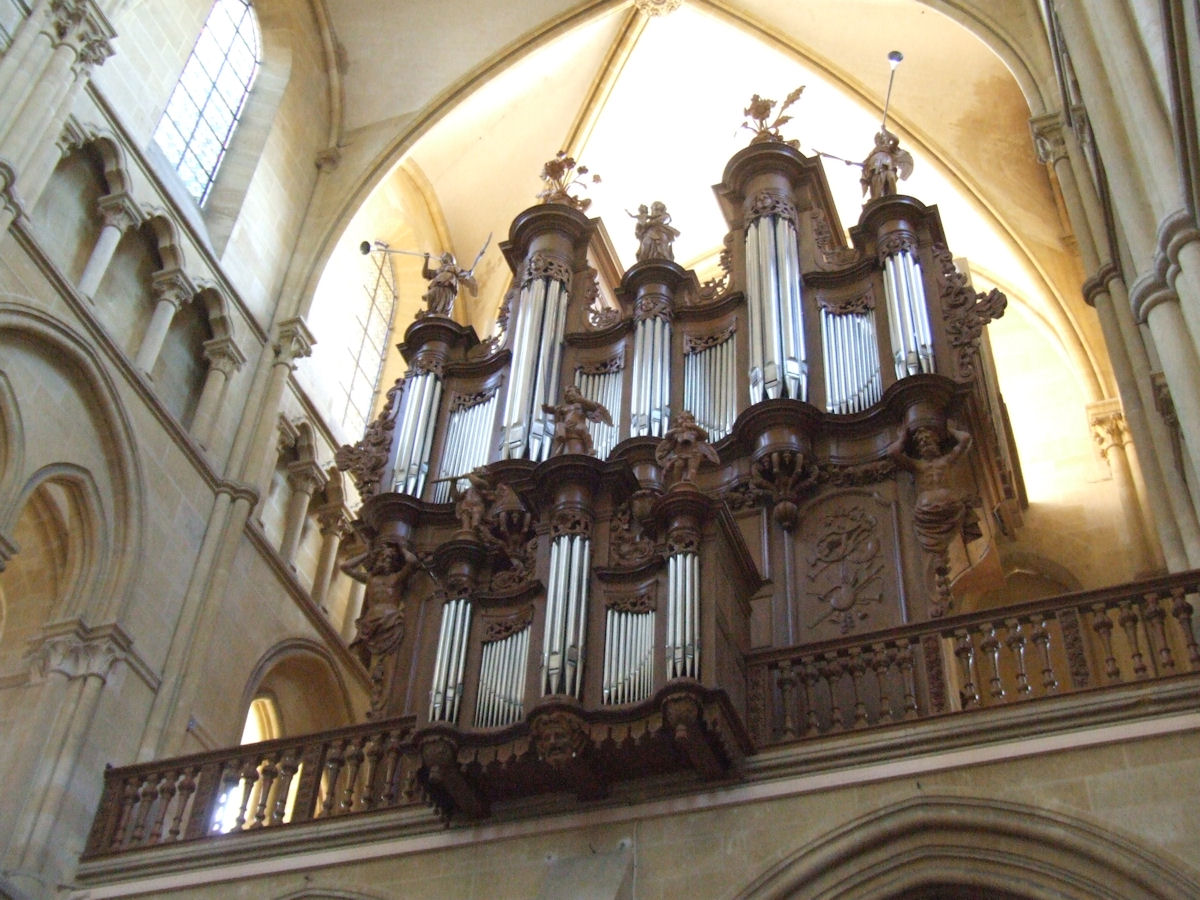
The organ on a gallery at the end of the nave

During the restoration of the abbatial churchchurch led by Boeswillwald, the organ was dismantled and placed on the brand-new stone tribune at the end of the nave. No one knows what happened to the original wooden organ loft, built by Christophe Moucherel and carpenter Henry Baillard in the north transept, which, together with the organ, formed a 14-meters-high carpentry ensemble.

In 1879, the organ builder Dejardin completed an almost complete overhaul of the organ, changing the windchests and blower but partly reusing the old pipework. Unfortunately, war broke out, and in 1917, the Germans looted all the metal pipes to supply their armaments factories. It wasn't until 1923–1924 that Pol Renault, an organ builder from Signy-le-Petit, replaced the missing tubes with 'war damage' compensation. Jean Gomrée completed this work in 1972 and 1973. And the organ restoration was completed in 1991 by Barthélemy Formentelli, a Verona-based organ builder and connoisseur of Moucherel's work.

The composition of the organ is as follows:

Positive (11 sets)
Diapasons	4'
Bourdon	8'
Doublet
Supply	III
Cymbal	II
Nasard
Quarte
Seventeenth
Larigot
Trumpet
Cromorne

Great Organ (17 sets)
Diapason	8'
Open diapason
Doublet
Fourniture	IV
Cymbal	IV
Bourdon	16'
Bourdon	8'
Flute	4'
Big Seventeenth
Nazard
Quarte	8'
Seventeenth
Grand-Cornet	V
1st Trumpet
2nd Trumpet
Clarion
Vox humana

Story (3 sets)
Cornet	V
Trumpet
Oboe

Écho (7 jset
Bourdon	8'
Open diapason
Nazard
Doublette
Seventeenth
Cymbal	III
Musette

Crankset (6 sets)
Flute	16'
Flute	8'
Flute	4'
Bombardon
Trumpet
Clarion

Other
POS/GO drawer coupling
Tirasse GO
Two interchangeable pedals French and German-style
Trembling softly in the wind
Trembling strong with lost wind
Rossignol
Gueulard or Tête de Maure (Moor's Head).
Angelot: Orchestra Conductor

== See also ==
- Eugène Viollet-le-Duc
- Notre-Dame de Paris
- Abbatial church

== Bibliography ==
- Demouy, Patrick (2005). Genèse d'une cathédrale : Les archevêques de Reims et leur Église aux XIe et XIIe siècles (in French). Langres: Éditions Dominique Guéniot. ISBN 2-87825-313-2.
- Motte, Paul (1996). L'Abbatiale de Mouzon : un rêve de pierre (in French). Terres Ardennaises.
- Lallemand, Jean (1994). L'abbatiale de Mouzon. Les Amis du Vieux Mouzon (in French).
- Parisse, Michel (1972). "La fondation de l'abbaye de Mouzon en 971". Millénaire de l'Abbaye de Mouzon. Revue Historique Ardennaise (in French).
- Leflon, Jean (1972). "L'abbaye de Mouzon et la Révolution". Millénaire de l'Abbaye de Mouzon. Revue Historique Ardennaise (in French).
- Souchal, François (1972). "Remarques sur la construction de l'abbatiale Notre-Dame de Mouzon". Millénaire de l'Abbaye de Mouzon. Revue Historique Ardennaise (in French).
- Collin, Hubert (1972). "Les fortifications de Mouzon des origines au xviie siècle". Millénaire de l'Abbaye de Mouzon. Revue Historique Ardennaise (in French).
- Gelu, Jean-Philippe; Brossard, Pierre (1972). Les orgues de Mouzon. Les Amis du Vieux Mouzon (in French).
- Crozet, René (1969). François Souchal. — L'abbatiale de Mouzon (in French). Vol. 12. Cahiers de civilisation médiévale.
- Collin, Hubert (1969). Les Églises anciennes des Ardennes. Édition de l'office départemental du tourisme des Ardennes (in French).
- Souchal, François (1967). L'Abbatiale de Mouzon (in French). Éditions de la Société d'études ardennaises.
- Donau, Victor (1920). L'église abbatiale de Mouzon (Ardennes) (in French). Vol. 79. Bulletin monumental dirigé par Eugène Lefèvre-Pontalis sous les auspices de la Société française d'archéologie.
- Casier, J. (1907). Monographie de l'église de Notre-Dame de Mouzon. Revue Historique Ardennaise (in French). Vol. 14.
- Jadart, Henri (1906). Les édifices religieux du département des Ardennes – Essai de statistique et de bibliographie (in French). L. Michaud libraire éditeur.
- Frézet, Abbé (1903). Introduction de la réforme de Saint-Vanne dans l'abbaye de Mouzon. Revue Historique Ardennaise (in French). Vol. 10.
- Goffart, Nicolas. Précis d'une histoire de la ville de Mouzon (in French). Arcis-sur-Aube.
- Boeswillwald, Émile (1876). "Rapport sur l'église de Mouzon". Edmond du Sommerard, Les monuments historiques de France à l'Exposition de Vienne. Imprimerie nationale.
