= St. Stephen's Cathedral, Passau =

St. Stephen's Cathedral
- Stephansdom
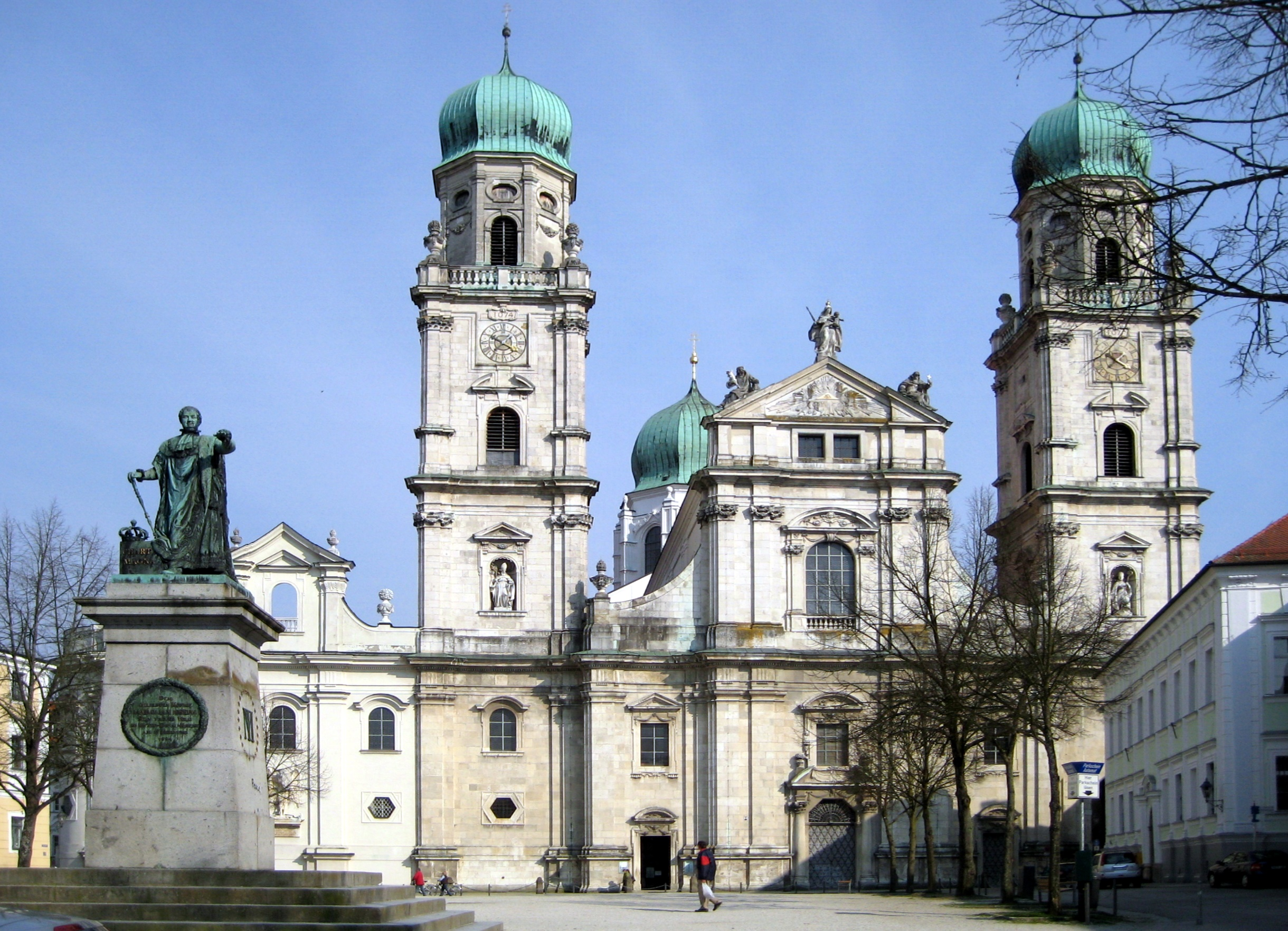
- St. Stephen's Cathedral

- Location within Bavaria Location within Germany
- 48°34′27″N 13°27′55″E
- Location: Passau
- Country: Germany
- Denomination: Roman Catholic

History
- Status: Active
- Founded: 1668

Architecture
- Functional status: Cathedral
- Architect: Carlo Lurago
- Architectural type: Church
- Style: Baroque
- Completed: 1693

Specifications
- Length: 100 m (328 ft 1 in)

Administration
- Diocese: Diocese of Passau

St. Stephen's Cathedral (German: Dom St. Stephan) is a baroque church from 1688 in Passau, Germany, dedicated to Saint Stephen. It is the seat of the Catholic Bishop of Passau and the main church of his diocese.

== History ==
Since 730, there have been many churches built on the site of the current cathedral. The current church, a baroque building around 100 metres (328 ft) long, was built from 1668 to 1693 after a fire in 1662 destroyed its predecessor, of which only the late gothic eastern side remains. The cathedral's overall plan was made by Carlo Lurago, its interior decoration by Giovanni Battista Carlone, and its frescos by Carpoforo Tencalla.

== Bells ==
The cathedral has eight large bells in the bell rooms in the north and south towers. The largest bell or bourdon is named,"Pummerin" at 7,550 kg (16,640 lb) cast in 1952. It alongside "Sturmerin" weighing 5,300 kg (11,700 lb) cast in 1733 hang in the south tower. The other six bells hang in the north tower. They include: the second bourdon "Misericordia" weighing 6,000 kg (13,000 lb), the Angelus bell, "Predigtglocke", "Elfuhrglocken", the Choir bell, and "Dignitar". A ninth bell, the "Zeichenglocke" hangs near the sacristy door. 3 of the 8 bells serve as clock bells; the Elfuhrglocken chimes every quarter hour while Predigtglocke and Stürmerin in succession chime each the number of a full hour. In Germany, the bells are always numbered from largest to smallest, Bell 1 is always the tenor or bourdon.

Bell	Name (German)	Name (English)	Year of casting	Founder, place of casting	Mass	Tower
1	Pummerin (Bourdon Bell)		1952	Rudolf Perner Bell Foundry, Passau	7,850 kg (17,310 lb)	South
2	Misericordia (2nd Bourdon)		1999	Rudolf Perner Bell Foundry, Passau	5,950 kg (13,120 lb)	North
3	Stürmerin	Striker	1733	Nikolaus Drackh, Passau	5,600 kg (12,300 lb)	South
4	Dignitär	Dignified	1897	Lorenz Bell Foundry, Passau	3,375 kg (7,441 lb)	North
5	Predigtglocke	Preacher Bell	1896	Lorenz Bell Foundry, Passau	2,400 kg (5,300 lb)	North
6	Angelusglocke	Angelus bell	1897	Lorenz Bell Foundry, Passau	1,250 kg (2,760 lb)	North
7	Elfuhrglocke	Eleven o'clock bell	1896	Lorenz Bell Foundry, Passau	800 kg (1,800 lb)	North
8	Chorglocke	Choir bell	1951	Rudolf Perner Bell Foundry, Passau	552 kg (1,217 lb)	North

== Pipe organ ==
Once the largest organ in the world, Passau Cathedral's pipe organ has been surpassed by more recent instruments, including Wanamaker's organ in the U.S. It remains the largest church organ outside of the U.S.

The organ currently has 17,774 pipes and 233 registers, all of which can be played with the five-manual general console in the gallery. Portions of the organ have their own mechanical-action or electric-action consoles, for a total of six consoles.

The organs at this cathedral have continually been added to over the years. The "organ" is really several separate organs of different tonal styles, all accessible from one or more consoles. The organs of the First Congregational Church of Los Angeles, California, U.S. have also grown over the years and play from twin consoles; together, the two organs have 346 ranks and over 20,000 pipes. By contrast, the Cadet Chapel Organ of the United States Military Academy, West Point, New York is a single organ. It has also been added to continuously over the years and is larger still with more than 23,500 pipes. It plays from a single console.

In 2017, Arnold Schwarzenegger was allowed to play the cathedral's pipe organ, a "childhood dream" according to the actor.

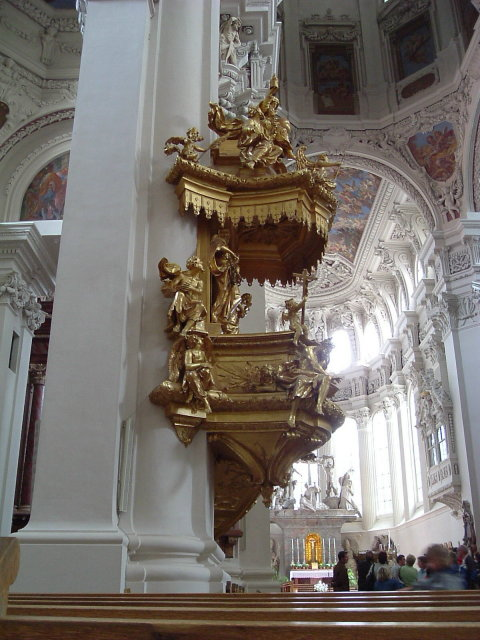
Chancel

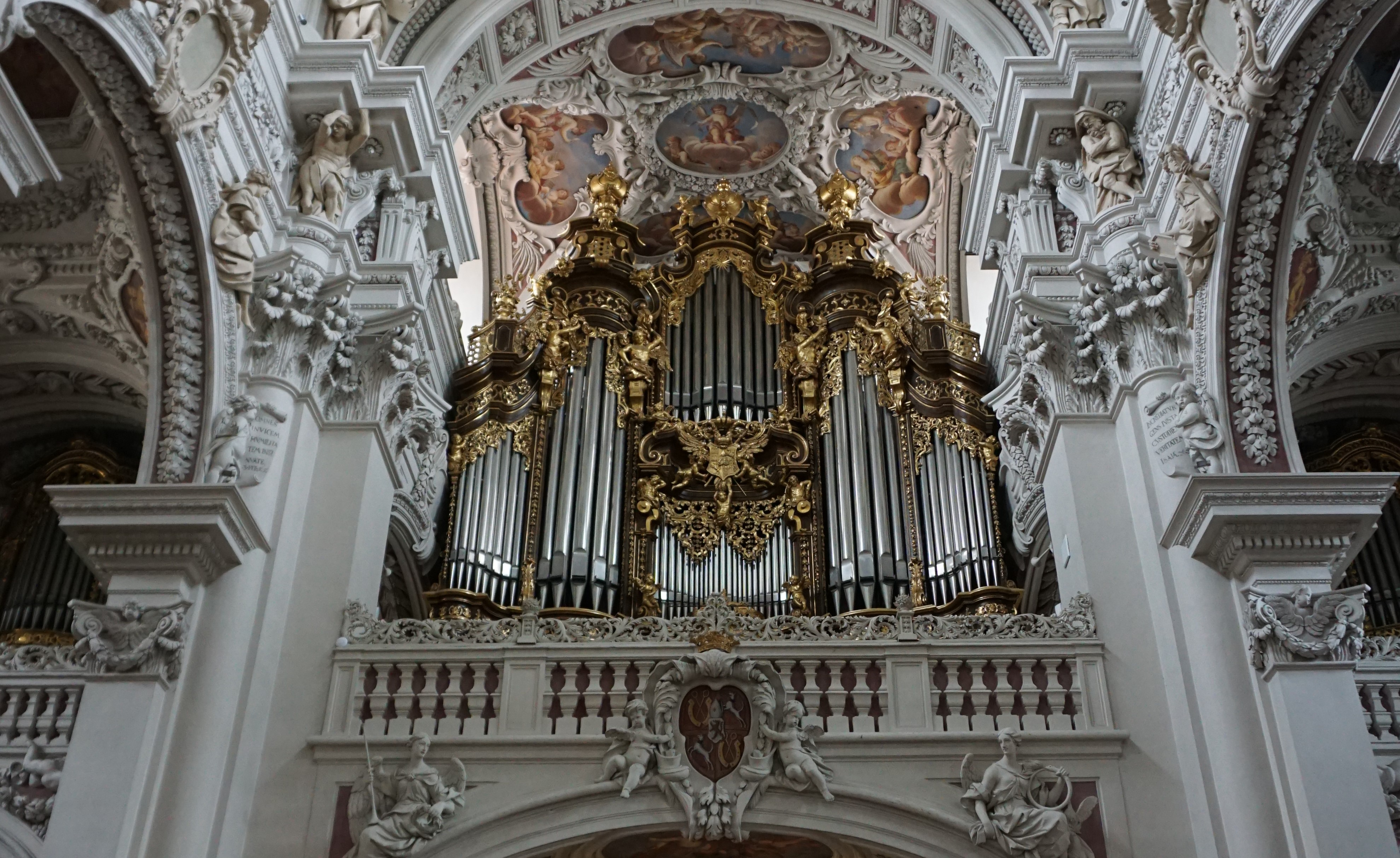
Main west Organ in St. Stephen's Cathedral in Passau

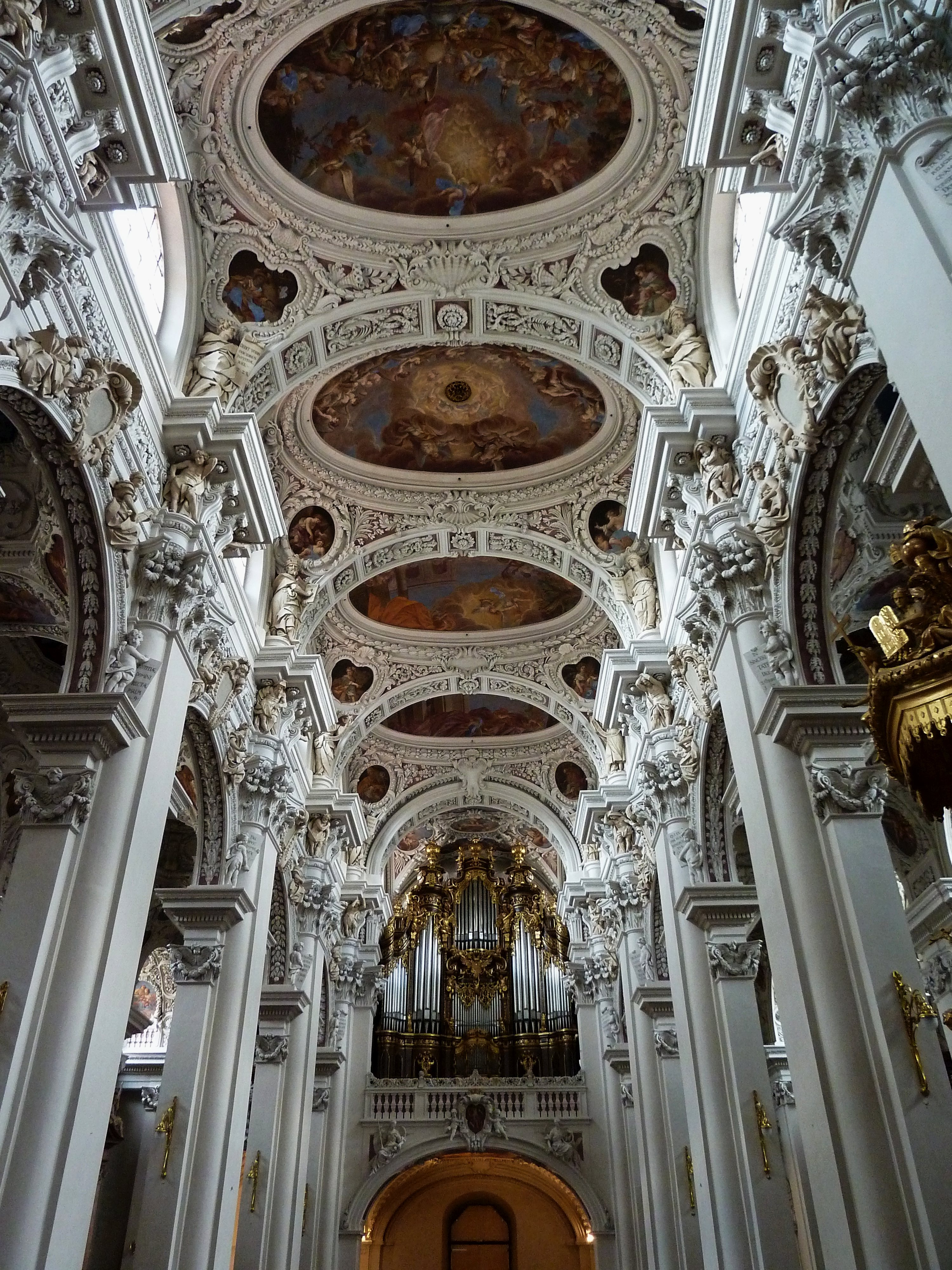
Dome paintings

== Recordings (selection) ==
- Die Passauer Domorgel : The most beautiful organ in the world Passau Cathedral Helga Schauerte-Maubouet, (Syrius, 141310) 1995.

== See also ==
- List of pipe organs
