= List of pipe organ stops =

An organ stop can be one of three things:

- the control on an organ console that selects a particular sound
- the row of organ pipes used to create a particular sound, more appropriately known as a rank
- the sound itself

Organ stops are sorted into four major types: principal, string, reed, and flute.

This is a sortable list of names that may be found associated with electronic and pipe organ stops. Countless stops have been designed over the centuries, and individual organs may have stops, or names of stops, used nowhere else. This non-comprehensive list deals mainly with names of stops found on numerous Baroque, classical and romantic organs. Here are a few of the most common ones:

Stop name	Alternative name	Type	Notes
Aeoline (English)	Aéoline (French?); Éoline (French) Eolina (Italian) Echo Salicional (English)	String	An extremely small scaled stop with a very delicate, airy tone; built frequently as a single-rank stop, or as a double-rank celeste.
Baryton (French)	Baritone (English) Baritono (Italian) Varitono (Spanish)	Reed	A 16 ft, 8 ft and/or 4 ft pitch reed stop imitative of the instrument. It can also refer to a Vox Humana at 16’ pitch.
Blockflöte (German)	Block Flute (English) Blokfløjte (Danish) Blokfluit (Dutch) Blockpfeife (German)	Flute	German for "recorder"; a wide scaled conical or stopped flute of 4 ft or 2 ft pitch, taking its name from the common flute called a "recorder" which its tone imitates.
Bombarde (French)	Bombarda (Italian) Bombardon (English) Bombardone (Italian)	Reed	A powerful chorus reed stop with a brassy timbre, occurring on the manuals at 16 ft (and occasionally 8 ft), or in the pedal at 16 ft or 32 ft pitch; similar tone as the Ophicleide or the Trombone.
Bourdon (French)	Bordun (German) Bordone (Italian) Bordón (Spanish) Bardone (Italian)	Flute	A wide-scaled stopped-flute, usually 16 ft and/or 8 ft pitch on the manuals, and 16 ft (sometimes 8 ft), and/or 32 ft pitch in the pedals (where it may be called Subbass or Contra Bourdon).
Cello (Italian)	Violoncelle (French) Violoncello (English) Violoncello (Italian)	String	A string stop at 8 ft and/or 16 ft pitch; has a warmer, more "romantic" tone than the Gamba.
Chimney Flute (English)	Rohrflöt(e) (German) Roerfluit (Dutch) Flauto Camino (Italian) Flûte à Cheminée (French)	Flute	A stopped flue stop with a chimneyed stopper.
Choralbass (German)	Choralbasset (German)	Principal	A 4 ft pitch strongly voiced octave Diapason in the pedal division, mainly for cantus firmus use.
Claribel (English)	Clarabella (English) Clarabel Flute (English) Claribel Flute (English) Melodia (American english)	Flute	An 8 ft pitch open wood manual stop.
Clarinet (English)	Clarinette (French/German); Clarionet (English) Clarinetto (Italian) Klarinett(e) (German)	Reed	A reed stop with a rich tone imitating the orchestral instrument.
Clarion (English)	Clairon (French) Clarino (Italian) Clarín (Spanish) Clarone (Italian) Klaroen (Dutch)	Reed	A 4 ft or 2 ft pitch Trumpet, it is a chorus reed.
Cor Anglais (French)	English Horn (English) Englisch Horn (German) Angle Horn (English)	Reed	A 16 ft or 8 ft pitch reed stop imitative of the instrument of the same name.
Cornet (French)	Cornett (German) Corneta (Spanish)	Flute	A multi-rank stop consisting of up to five ranks of wide-scaled pipes. The pitches include 8 ft, 4 ft, 2 2/3 ft, 2 ft and 1 3/5 ft. Three and four-rank cornets eliminate 8 ft and 4 ft ranks. This stop is not imitative of the orchestral cornet. In a theater organ, it usually refers to a 4’ extension of the tuba or trumpet.
Cornopean (English)		Reed	An 8 ft pitch chorus reed similar to the Trumpet; normally located in the Swell division. It is usually quieter than a trumpet.
Cromorne (French)	Krummhorn (German) Kromhoorn (Dutch) Cremona (English) Cormorne (French)	Reed	A cylindrical solo reed that has a distinct buzzing or bleating sound, imitative of the historical instrument of the same name.
Diapason (English)	Open Diapason (English) Montre (French) Principale (Italian) Principal (English) Prinzipal (German) Principaal (Dutch) Prestant (Dutch) Praestant (Latin) Tenori (Italian)	Principal	A flue stop that is the "backbone" sound of the organ. Most commonly at 8 ft in manuals, and 8 ft or 16 ft in the pedals. It is the fundamental stop of the Classical Organ.
Diaphone	Diaphonic Diapason	Valvular	A special type of organ pipe that produces tone by using a felt hammer to beat air through the resonator. Common on theatre organs but not often used in classical instruments.
Dulcian (German)	Dulzian (German) Dulciane (French) Dulceon (Czech) Dolcian (German) Dulciaan (Dutch)	Reed	A half length cylindrical reed stop at 8 ft pitch on the manuals with a tone similar to that of a bassoon but more nasal.
Dulciana	Dulziana	String	An 8 ft pitch metal string stop. Usually the softest stop on an organ.
Fagotto (Italian)	Fagot (Dutch) Fagott (German) Bassoon (English) Basson (French)	Reed	A 16 ft or 8 ft pitch chorus reed. Inverted conical construction, softer than a trumpet or trombone.
Flageolet (English/French)	Flageoletta (Italian) Flautim (Spanish) Fistula Minima (Latin)	Flute	An open flute stop of 2 ft or 1 ft pitch.
Flûte Octaviante (French)		Flute	A 4 ft pitch Harmonic Flute.
Fugara		Principal/String hybrid	A flue stop in 4 ft or 8 ft pitch. The tone has a sharp "stringy" quality.
Gamba (Italian)	Viola da Gamba (Italian) Viola di Gamba (Italian) Viole de Gambe (French) Gambe (French)	String	A string stop that has a thinner, more cutting tone than the Cello stop. It is one of the earliest designs of string stops, and is named after the Baroque instrument viola da gamba.
Gedackt (German)	Gedeckt (German) Holpijp (Dutch) || Gedekt (Dutch) Gedakt (Danish) Pileata (Latin) Stopped Diapason (English)	Flute	A basic stopped 8 ft and/or 16 ft flute in the manuals, and stopped 16 ft and/or 8 ft flute voice in the pedal.
Gemshorn (English/German)	Gemshoorn (Dutch) Cor de Chamois (French) Bachflöte (German)	Flute/String hybrid	A flue stop usually at 4 ft or 2 ft pitch but sometimes 8 ft pitch; similar tone as Spitz Flute.
Gravissima (Latin)	Gravitone (Latin) Acoustic Bass (English) Basse acoustique (French)	Flute	A name for a resultant 64 ft flute (a 32 ft stop combined with a 21 2/3 ft stop, which is a fifth, producing a difference tone of 8 Hz on low C).
Harmonic Flute (English)	Flûte Harmonique (French) Flauta Armónica (Spanish) Harmonieflöte (German)	Flute	An open metal flute made to sound an octave above its length by means of a small hole at its midpoint. This stop has a very pure flute tone and was popularized by Aristide Cavaillé-Coll.
Hohlflöt(e) (German)	Hohl flute (German/English) Hohlpfeife (German) Holfluit (Dutch) Flûte Creuse (French)	Flute	A metal or wooden 8 ft open or stopped flute.
Keraulophon (Greek)	Keraulophone (Greek)	Flute	A rarely found flute stop at 8 ft pitch with a stringy, reedy tone. Its name translates to "hornpipe voice".
Larigot (French)	Largo (???) Petit Nasard (French) Diezmonovena (Spanish)	Mutation	A flute mutation stop at 1 1/3 ft pitch.
Mixture (English)	Mixtur (German) Mixtura (Spanish) Mixtuur (Dutch) Hintersatz (German) Fourniture (French) Ripieno (Italian) Plein Jeu (French) Lleno (Spanish)	Principal	Multi-rank stops that enhance the harmonics of the fundamental pitch, and are intended for use with foundation stops, not alone. Mixture IV indicates that the stop has four ranks. Mixture 15.19.22.26 indicates the composition.
Nachthorn (German)	Night Horn (English) Nachthoorn (Dutch) Cor de Nuit (French) Corno de Nacht (???) Pastorita (Italian)	Flute	A wide-scaled flute with a relatively small mouth, produces a soft, but penetrating sound; occurring at 8 ft and 4 ft pitch, and also at 2 ft pitch in the pedal.
Nasard (French)	Nasat (German) Nasardo (Italian/Spanish); Nazard (French?)	Mutation	A conical flute mutation stop of 2 2/3 ft pitch (sounding a twelfth above written pitch).
Nason Flute (English)	Nasonflöte (German) Nason (English)	Flute	Flute stop with stopped pipes. Usually 4 ft pitch in which the twelfth is often prominent.
None (German)	Neuvième (French) Twenty-Third (English)	Flute	A rare mutation stop of 8/9 ft, reinforcing the 8 ft harmonic series. (Sounds a twenty-third above written pitch.)
Oboe (Italian)	Hautbois (French) Hautboy (English) Hoboe (???)	Reed	An 8 ft pitch reed stop used as both a solo stop and a chorus reed.
Octave (English)	Octav (German) Octaaf (Dutch) Octava (Spanish) Ottava (Italian) Prestant (Dutch) Praestant (Latin) Principal (English)	Principal	A 4 ft open diapason. "Prestant" often indicates ranks that have pipes mounted in the front of the organ case.
Octavin (French)	Ottavina (Italian)	Flute	A 2 ft pitch Harmonic Flute.
Ophicleide	Ophicléide (French) Officleide (Italian) Ophicleïd (German) Ophikleid (???)	Reed	A powerful reed stop, much like the Bombarde or Trombone; normally a 16 ft or 32 ft pedal reed; unusually an 8 ft or 16 ft on the manuals.
Orchestral Oboe (English)	Orchestral Hautboy (English) Hautbois d'Orchestre (French)	Reed	A different stop from Oboe; intended to imitate the orchestral instrument; of smaller scale than the non-imitative oboe.
Piccolo (Italian)	Zwergpfeife (German)	Flute	A 2 ft and/or 1 ft pitch flute.
Quarte (French)	Quarte de Nasard (French) Quarte de Nazard (French)	Flute	A 2 ft pitch flute on 17th and 18th century French organs; short for Quarte de Nasard, sounding an interval of a fourth above the Nasard stop.
Quint (French/German)	Quinte (French/German) Quinta (Latin/Italian) Gros Nasard (French) Fifth (English) Double Twelfth (English)	Mutation	A resultant mutation stop, 5 1/3 ft pitch on the manuals reinforcing the 16 ft harmonic series or 10 2/3 ft pitch in the pedal reinforcing the 32 ft harmonic series. It can be made with a Tibia Clausa, Diapason or flute rank.
Quintadena (German)	Quintaton (English?) Quintatön (German)	Flute	Flue stop of 4 ft, 8 ft, or 16 ft foot pitch with stopped pipes and a flute tone in which the twelfth is prominent. It is commonly found on large theater organs.
Regal (English/German)	Régale (French) Regale (Italian) Regaal (Dutch)	Reed	A reed stop with fractional-length resonators; produces a buzzy sound with low fundamental frequency.
Rohrflöt(e) (German)	Chimney Flute (English) Flauto a Camino (Italian) Rohr Flute (German/English) Roerfluit (Dutch) Rorflojte (Danish)	Flute	German for "reed flute"; a semi-capped metal pipe with a narrow, open-ended tube (i.e. "chimney") extending from the top which resembles a reed.
Sackbut (English)		Reed	A reed stop that has a similar sound to the trombone. Found on the IV manual Kenneth Tickell organ of Worcester Cathedral, Worcestershire, England, where it has wooden resenators.
Salicional (English?)	Salicionale (Italian) Salicionaal (Dutch) Salicet (???) Salicis Fistula (Latin)	Principal/String hybrid	An 8 ft (sometimes 4 ft or 16 ft) string stop, softer in tone than the Gamba.
Schalmei (German)	Shawm (English) Schalmey (German) Chalumeau (French) Schallmey (German?)	Reed	A reed with a buzzy timbre, of the Regal class. Found at 16 ft, 8 ft and 4 ft.
Scharf(f) (German)	Scherp (Dutch) Sharp (English) Sharp Mixture (English) Akuta (German) Acuta (Latin) Vox Acuta (Latin)	Principal	A high-pitched mixture stop.
Sesquialtera (Latin)	Sollicinal (German)	Flute	Comprises ranks at 2 2/3 ft and 1 3/5 ft.
Sifflöt(e) (German)	Sifflet (French)	Flute	A 1 ft pitch flute.
Speelfluyt (Old Dutch)	Flute (English)	Flute	A 1 ft pitch flute. The Speelfluyt was reconstructed by Jürgen Ahrend for the Schnitger organ in the Martinikerk Groningen out of one remaining pipe.
Spitz Flute (English)	Spitzflöte (German) Spire Flute (English)	Flute/String hybrid	A 4 ft or 2 ft pitch flute with metal pipes tapered to a point at the top; similar tone as Gemshorn.
Suabe Flute		Flute	Flute stop of 4 ft or 8 ft pitch with a bright, clear tone.
Super Octave (English)	Doublette (French) Fifteenth (English) Quincena (Spanish) Quintadecima (Italian) Quinzième (French) Superoctav (German) Superoctaaf (Dutch) Regula Minima (Latin)	Principal	The manual 2 ft Principal or Diapason; its name merely signifies that it is above (i.e. "super") the 4 ft Octave.
Tibia Clausa (Latin)	Tibia (Latin)	Flute	A large-scale, stopped wood flute pipe, usually with a leathered lip; performs same function in a theatre pipe organ as a principal in a classical organ.
Tierce (French)	Seventeenth (English) Septadecima (Latin) Terz (German) Terts (Dutch)	Mutation	A flute mutation stop pitched 1 3/5 ft, supporting the 8 ft harmonic series.
Trichterregal (German)	Trechterregal (German)	Reed	An 8 ft pitch reed stop on a pipe organ with funnel-shaped resonators. A trichterregal was used by Schnitger in the Schnitger organ that he built for St. James's Church, Hamburg.
Trombone (English/Italian/French)	Posaune (German) Bazuin (Dutch) Basun (Danish/Norwegian/Swedish)	Reed	A chorus reed simulating the trombone; most commonly in the pedal at 16 ft or 32 ft pitch; similar tone as Bombarde or Ophicleide.
Trompette en Chamade (French)	Horizontal Trumpet (English)	Reed	A solo trumpet laid horizontally; can often be heard over full organ.
Trompette Militaire (French)	Field Trumpet (English) Military Trumpet (English)	Reed	A powerful solo reed of the trumpet-family, with a brassy, penetrating tone.
Trumpet (English)	Trompete (German) Trompette (French) Trompet (Dutch) Trompeta (Spanish) Tromba (Italian)	Reed	A loud chorus reed stop, generally a single rank, with inverted conical resonators.
Tuba (English)	Trumpet (Latin)	Reed	A large-scale, high pressure, smooth solo reed usually 8 ft or 16 ft pitch in the manuals and 16 ft (sometimes 32 ft) pitch in the pedal. Tuba is Latin for Trumpet; it is not named after the orchestral tuba.
Tuba D'amore (Italian)	Tromba D'amore (Italian?) Posaune Der Liebe (German) Soft Trombone? (English?)	Chorus Reed	A soft? reed that is at 16, 8, and 4 ft pitch. This pipe is made of wood similar to a posaune or a bassoon. An example of this rank is located in the Echo Division at the Midmer Losh organ at Boardwalk Hall, NJ.
Twelfth (English)	Octave Quint (English) Open Twelfth (English) Quint (French/German/Dutch) Duodecima (Latin) Docena (Spanish)	Mutation	A principal mutation stop of 2 2/3 ft and/or 5 1/3 ft on the manuals and 5 1/3 ft and/or 10 2/3 ft on the pedals.
Twenty-Second (English)	Kleinoctav(e) (German) Vigesima Seconda (Italian) Super Super Octave (English) Two and Twentieth (English)	Principal	A 1 ft pitch principal in the manuals or a 2 ft pitch in the pedal.
Unda Maris (Latin)	Meerflöte (German)	Flute	Latin for "wave of the sea"; a very soft rank tuned slightly sharp or flat. It is drawn with another soft rank to create an undulating effect. Occasionally built as a double-rank stop called Unda Maris II, which has both a normal-pitched and detuned rank.
Voix Céleste (French)	Vox Celestis (Latin) Vox Coelestis (Latin) Voz Celeste (Spanish) Voix Lumineuse (French)	String	An 8 ft pitch string stop tuned slightly sharp or flat to create an undulating effect when combined with another string stop. Some variants contain both a normal-pitched and detuned rank.
Vox Angelica (Latin)	Voix Angelique (French)	String	A soft organ flue stop tuned slightly flat.
Vox Humana (Latin)	Voix Humaine (French) Voz Humana (Spanish) Voz Humane (Spanish) Human Voice (English)	Reed	Fractional-length Regal supposedly intended to imitate the human voice (hence the name). A theater organ usually has one rank of Vox Humana but this can go as high as four. Wurlitzer also made a Vox Humana Celeste.
Waldflöte (German)	Wald Flute (German/English) Waldpfeif(e) (German) Woudfluit (Dutch) Wood Flute (English) Flautado Kuerolofón (Spanish?) Flûte Champ (French) Flûte des Bois (French) Tibia Silvestris (Latin)	Flute	A soft flute stop usually at 2 ft pitch but sometimes at 8 ft and/or 4 ft pitch.

== See also ==
- Abbatial church of Notre-Dame de Mouzon
- Eight-foot pitch
