= En chamade =

Organ pipe facing outwards

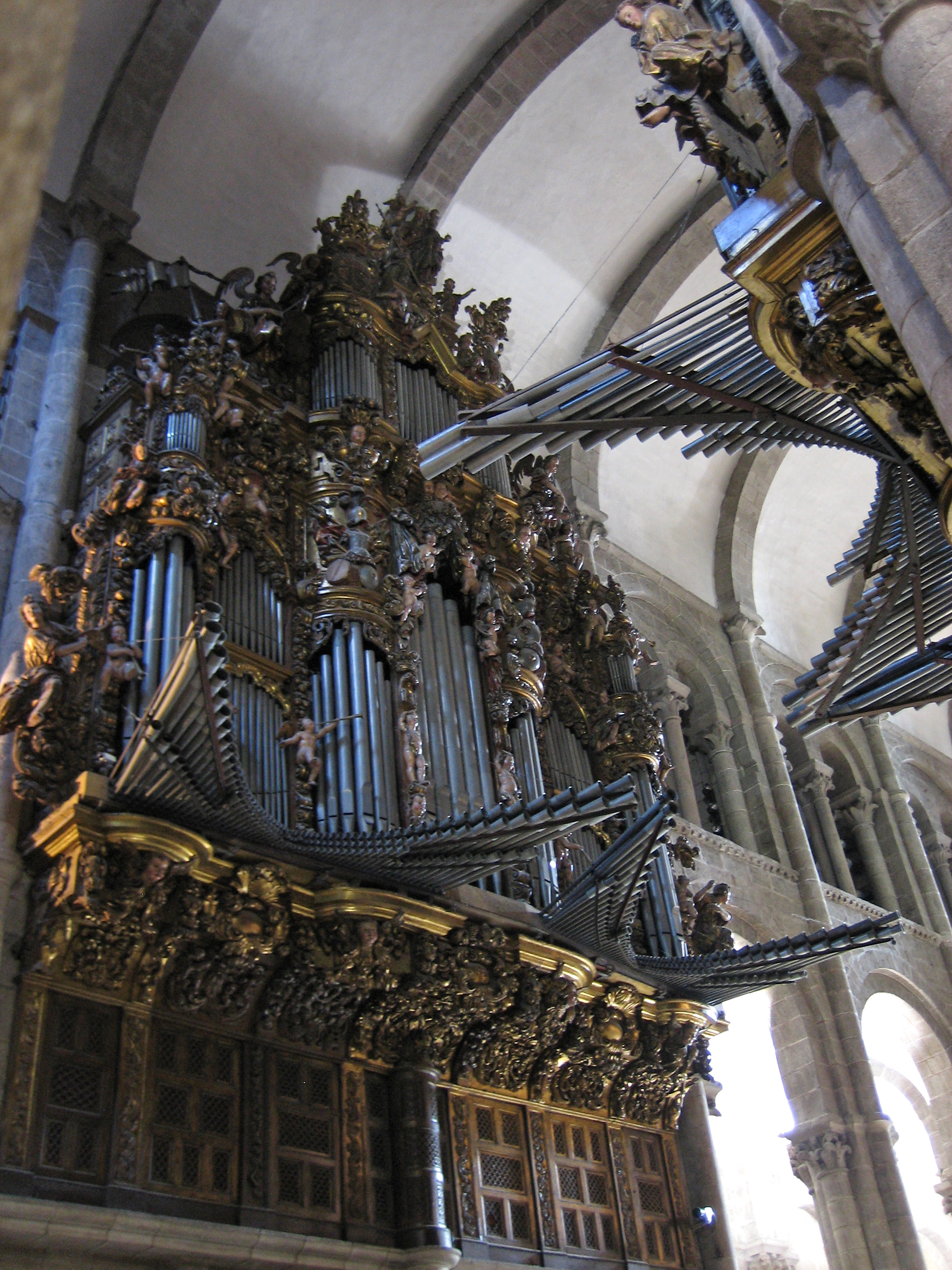
The double-faceted baroque organ of the Cathedral of Santiago de Compostela. Notice the en chamade pipes (trumpets) protruding outwards from its lower part.

En chamade (French: "to sound a parley") refers to powerfully voiced reed stops in a pipe organ that have been mounted horizontally, rather than vertically, in the front of the organ case, projecting out into the church or concert hall. They produce a commanding, loud trumpet-like tone, used for fanfares and solos. It is known as Fan Trumpet, Horizontal Trumpet, and Trompette en Chamade.

Any stop mounted en chamade will be much louder than a stop elsewhere in the organ, even though in church organs the stops may stand on the same wind pressure. In theatre and concert organs, en chamade stops often stand on higher wind pressure than the other stops, to sound even more powerful and commanding.

== History ==
First seen in Iberian and Mexican organs of the early eighteenth century, it came in many forms to create choruses in divided registers: the Trompeta de Batalla (8′), Bajoncillo (4′), Bajo (16′), Violeta (2′), Trompeta Magna (16′), the Claríns (either 8′ or 4′, the smaller ones in conjunction with the trompetas). Unlike the modern chamade trumpet, these all stood on pressures of 55 millimetres (2.2 in) compared to anywhere from 250 to 1,270 millimetres (9.8 to 50.0 in). Often confused with these, are the Trompeta Reales, or Trombeta Reales, which were never horizontal and were always located inside of the case. (Note: Neobaroque organ builders such as Schlicker made an En Chamade stop by this name)

Another example, first referred to as a trompette 'en chamade' is located in an organ built in Provence in 1772. The term was popularized by Aristide Cavaillé-Coll in his organs of the nineteenth century.

In modern organs, chamade stops are most often found at 8' and 4' as Trompette en Chamade and Clairon en Chamade respectively, with some examples at 16', and even rare instances at 5 1/3' (On the organ of St.Martin, Dudelange (Luxembourg), the organ of Our Lady of Lapa, Porto (Portugal) and the organ of Stiftsbasilika Waldsassen (Germany) have chamades at 16', 8', 5 1/3', and 4'). 'Chamade' is occasionally used as a stop name by itself.

Chamade was a trumpet call designed to be heard across the battlefield in the enemy camp, (announcing a desire to surrender).

== See also ==
- List of pipe organ stops
