= Church of Saint Peter, Céret =

Church in Pyrénées-Orientales, France

Coordinates: 42°29′07″N 2°44′53″E

Église Saint-Pierre de Céret
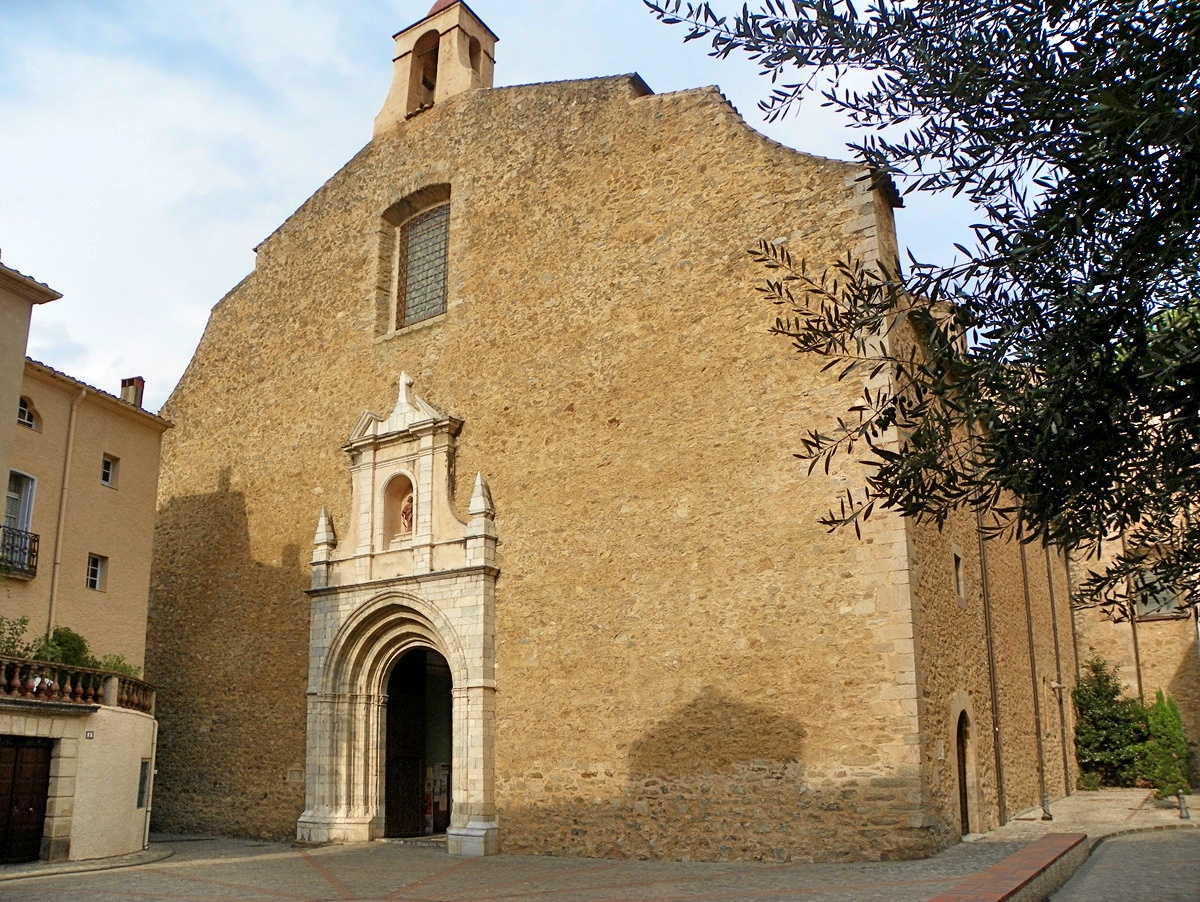
- Church of St. Peter: Western Façade

Religion
- Affiliation: Roman Catholic Church
- Diocese: Roman Catholic Diocese of Perpignan-Elne
- Province: Pyrénées-Orientales
- Region: Occitanie
- Status: Active

Location
- Location: Céret, France
- Municipality: Céret
- Interactive map of Église Saint-Pierre de Céret

Architecture
- Type: church
- Style: partly Romanesque
- Groundbreaking: 11th century
- Completed: 18th century

Specifications
- Direction of façade: West
- Materials: stone
- Designated as NHL: Monument historique (1998)

Saint Peter is a Roman Catholic church in Céret, southern France. Mentioned for the first time in 814, the present day church was built and rebuilt several times from the 11th to the 18th centuries. It was declared a national monument in 1998.

== Gallery ==
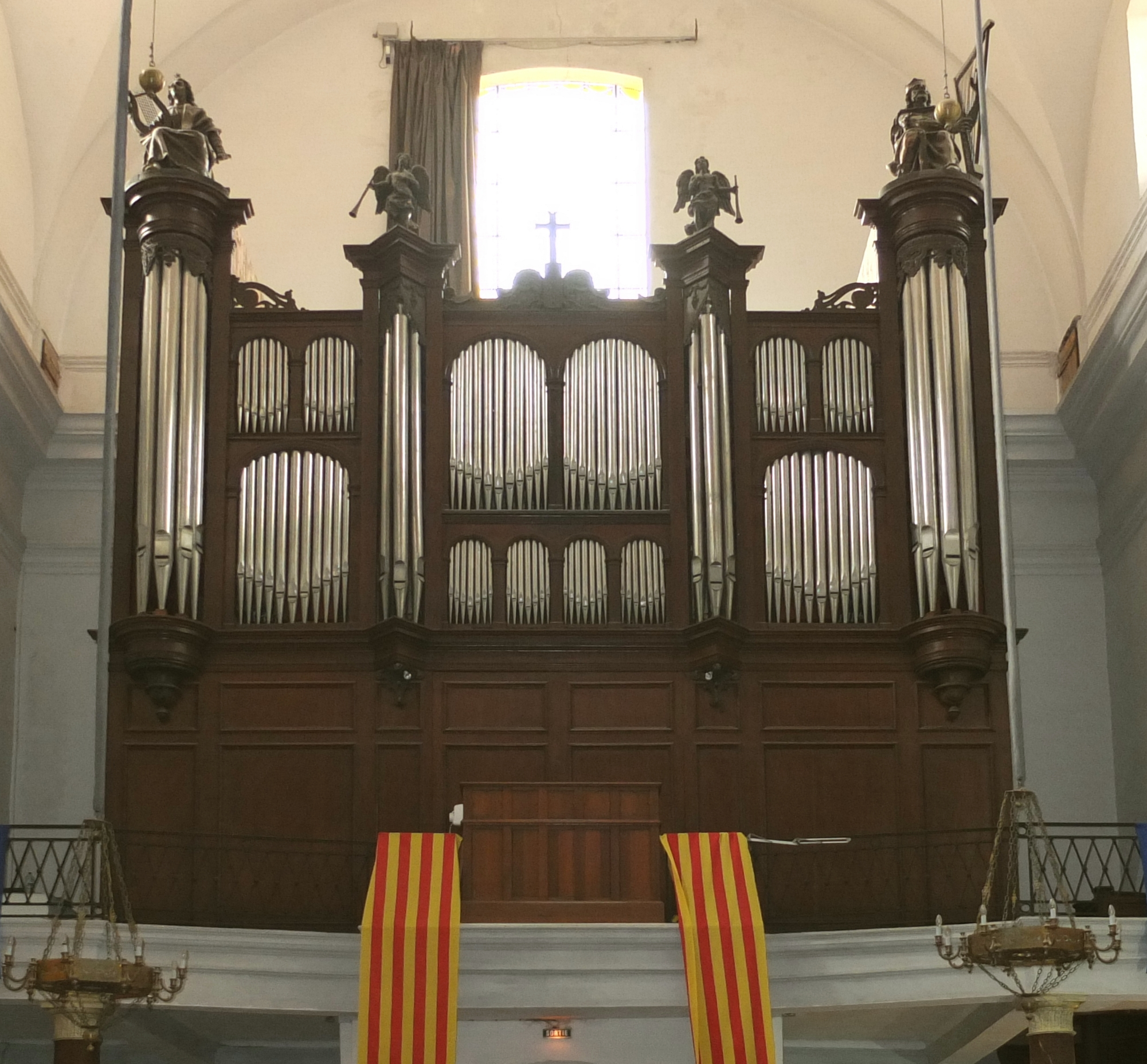
The great organ.

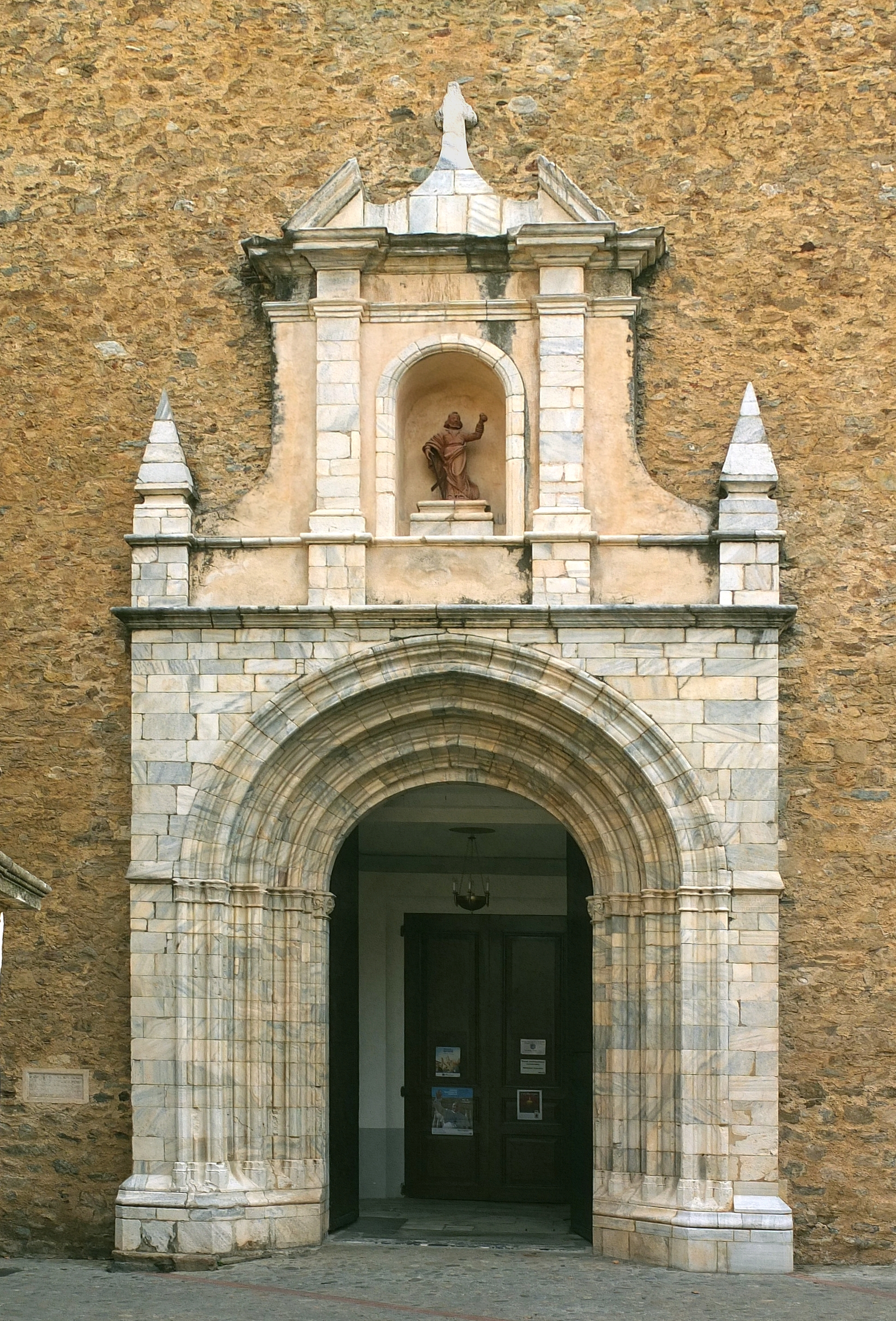
The portal.

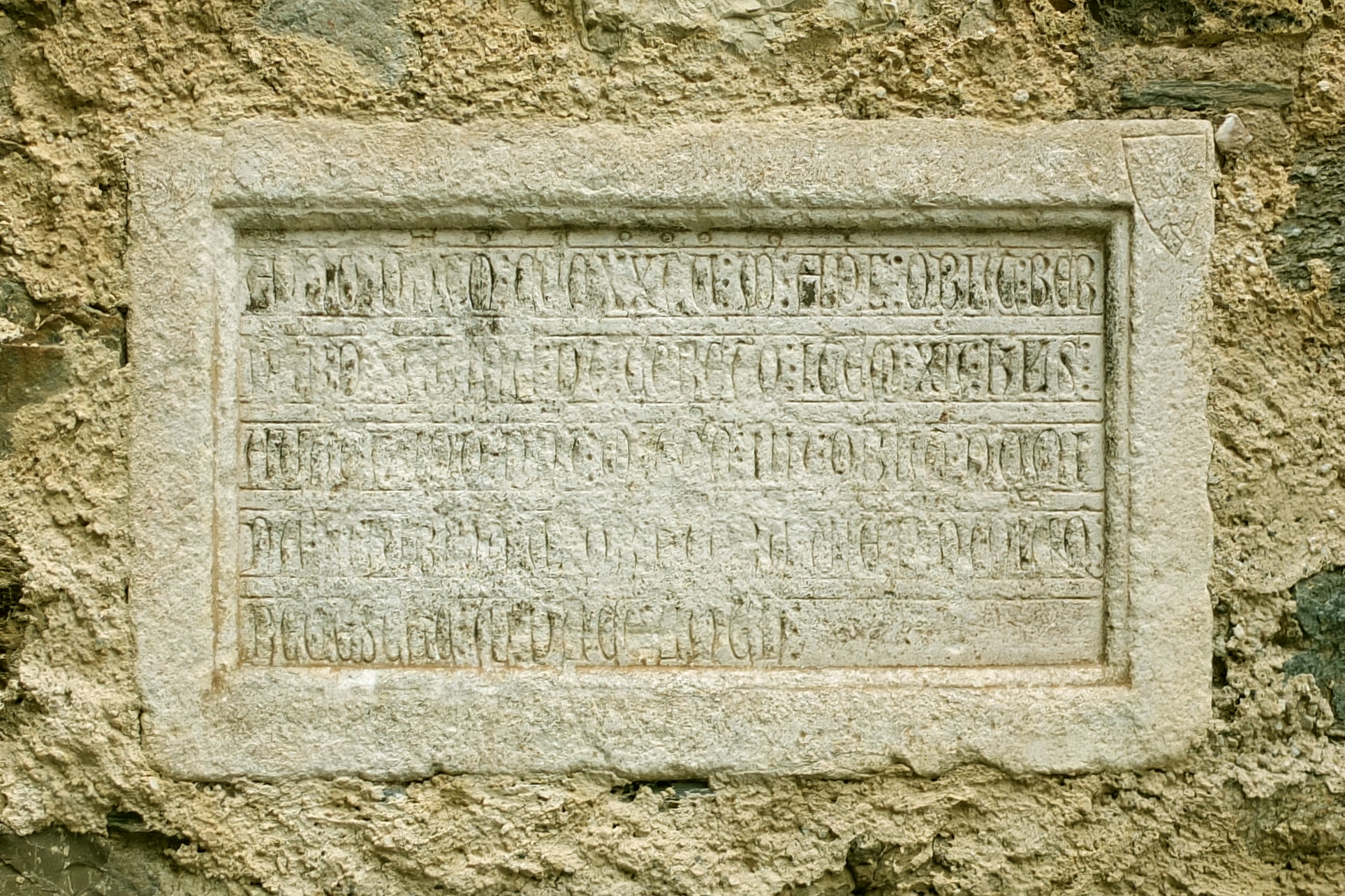
Funeral inscription of Bérengère de Valcrose.

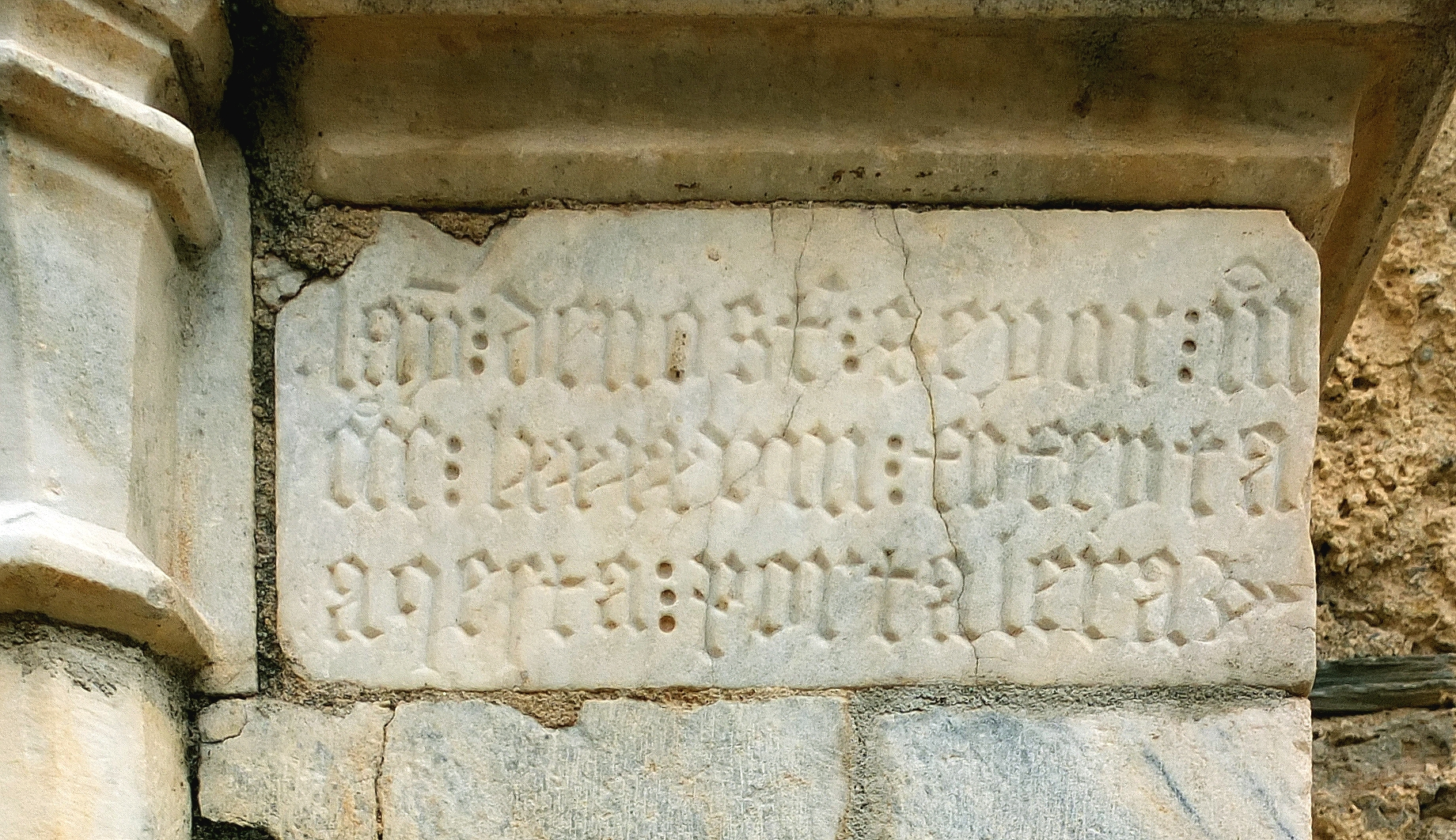
Memorial inscription of the portal's construction (1398).

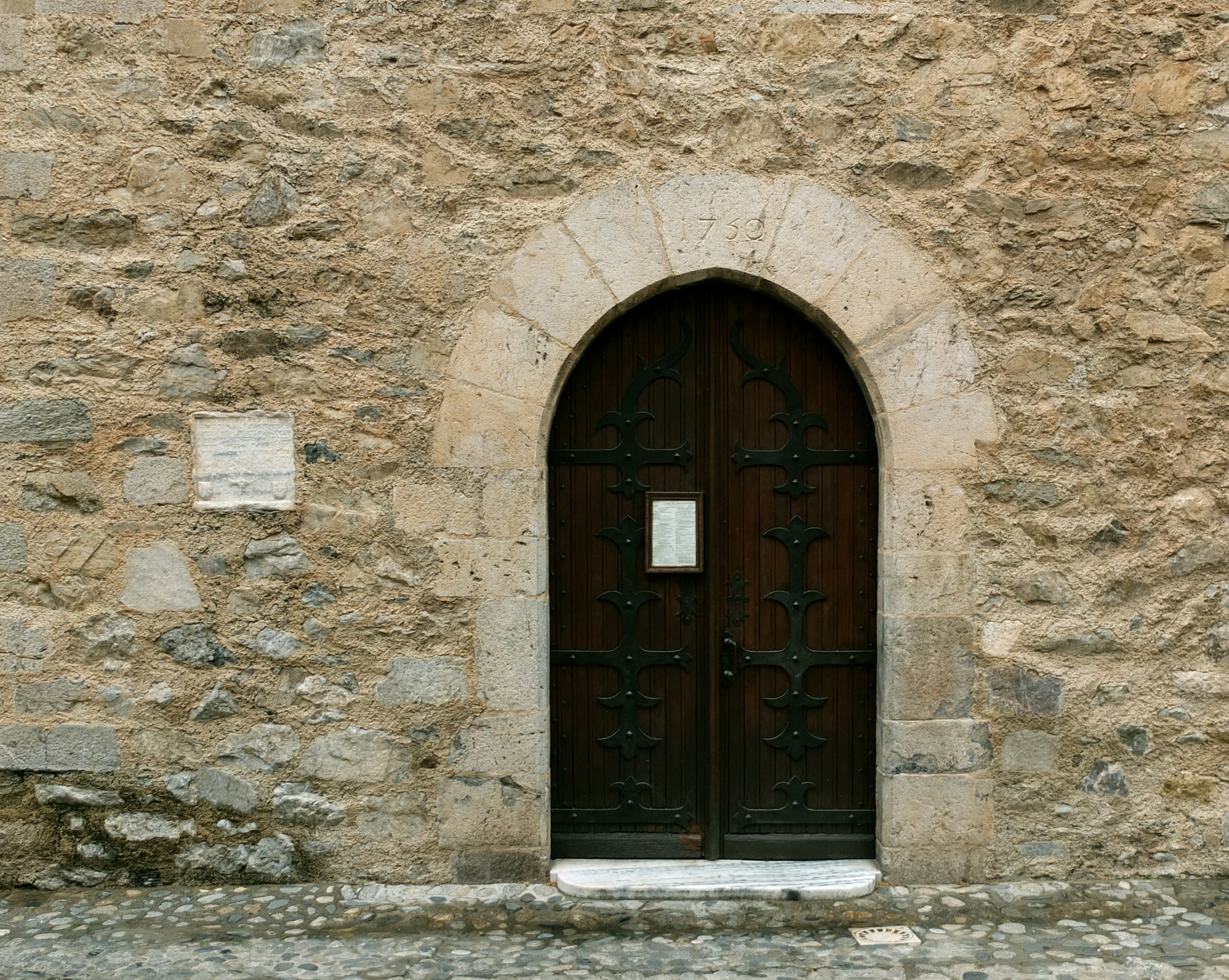
South portal.

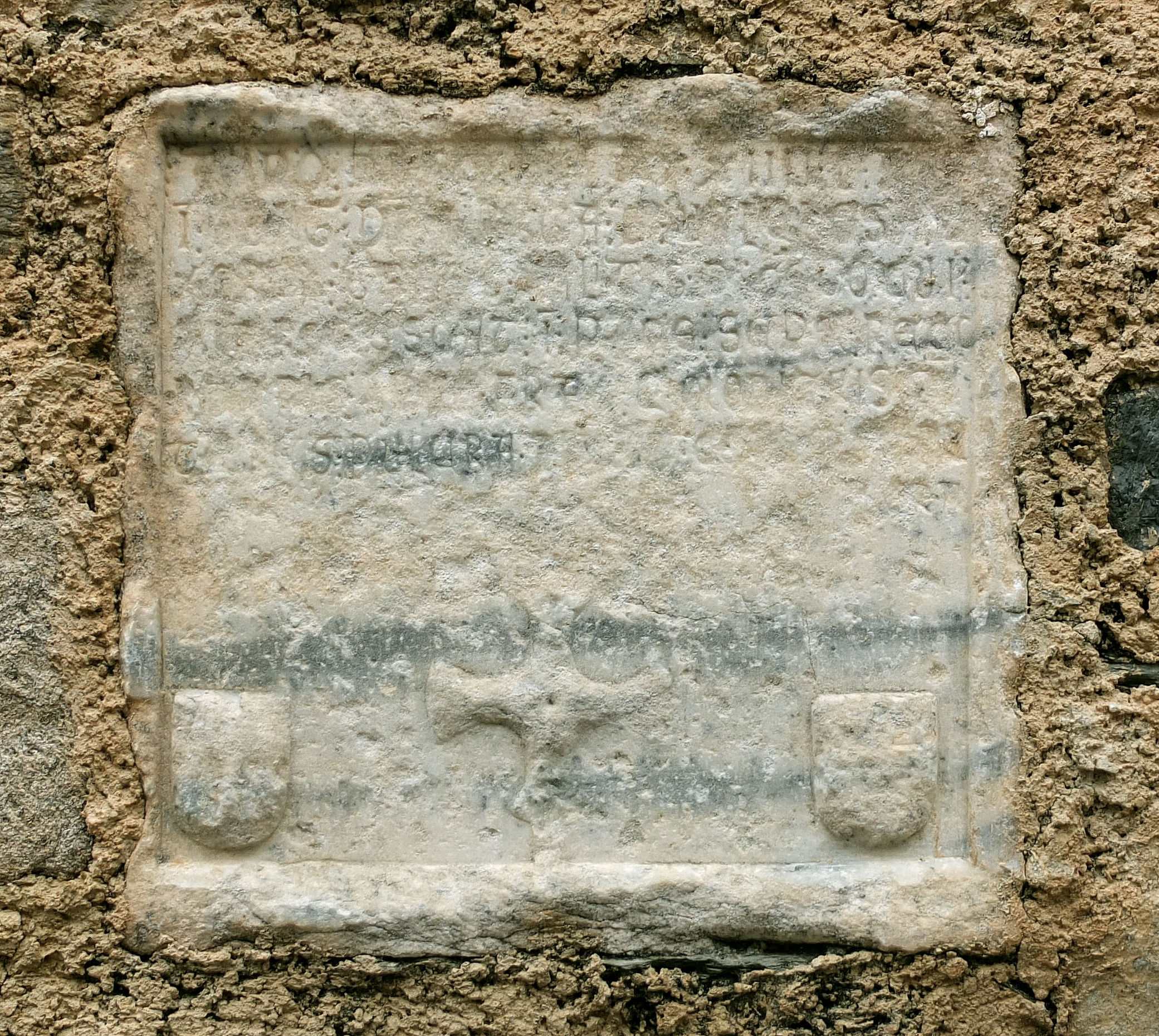
Funeral inscription of Bernard de Céret and his wife.

== The Great Organ ==
The organ of Saint-Pierre Church is the largest Romantic instrument in the Eastern Pyrenees, second only to the one in Perpignan Cathedral. Its composition is as follows:

I. Great	II. Choir	III. Swell	Pedal
Montre 16'	Bourdon 16'	Flûte traversière 8'	Bombarde 16'
Montre 8'	Flûte 8'	Trompette 8'	Trompette 8'
Basson 16'	Gambe 8'	Gambe 8'	Clairon 4'
Kéraulophone 8'	Voix humaine 8'	Bourdon 8'	Flûte 16'
Bourdon 8'	Trompette 8'	Bassons-Hautbois 8'	Flûte 8'
Trompette 8'	Salicional 8'	Flûte octave 4'	Flute 4'
Flûte harmonique 8'	Clarinette 8'	Clairon 4'	
Prestant 4'	Flûte 4'	Voix Céleste 8'	
Clairon 4'	Doublette 2'	Flûte octavin 2'	
Doublette 2'			
Cornet V			
Fourniture IV			

== Bibliography ==
- Mallet, Géraldine (2003). Églises romanes oubliées du Roussillon (in French). Montpellier: Les Presses du Languedoc. ISBN 978-2-8599-8244-7.
