= St.-Jakobus-Kirche, Ilmenau =

St.-Jakobus-Kirche
- "St James Church"
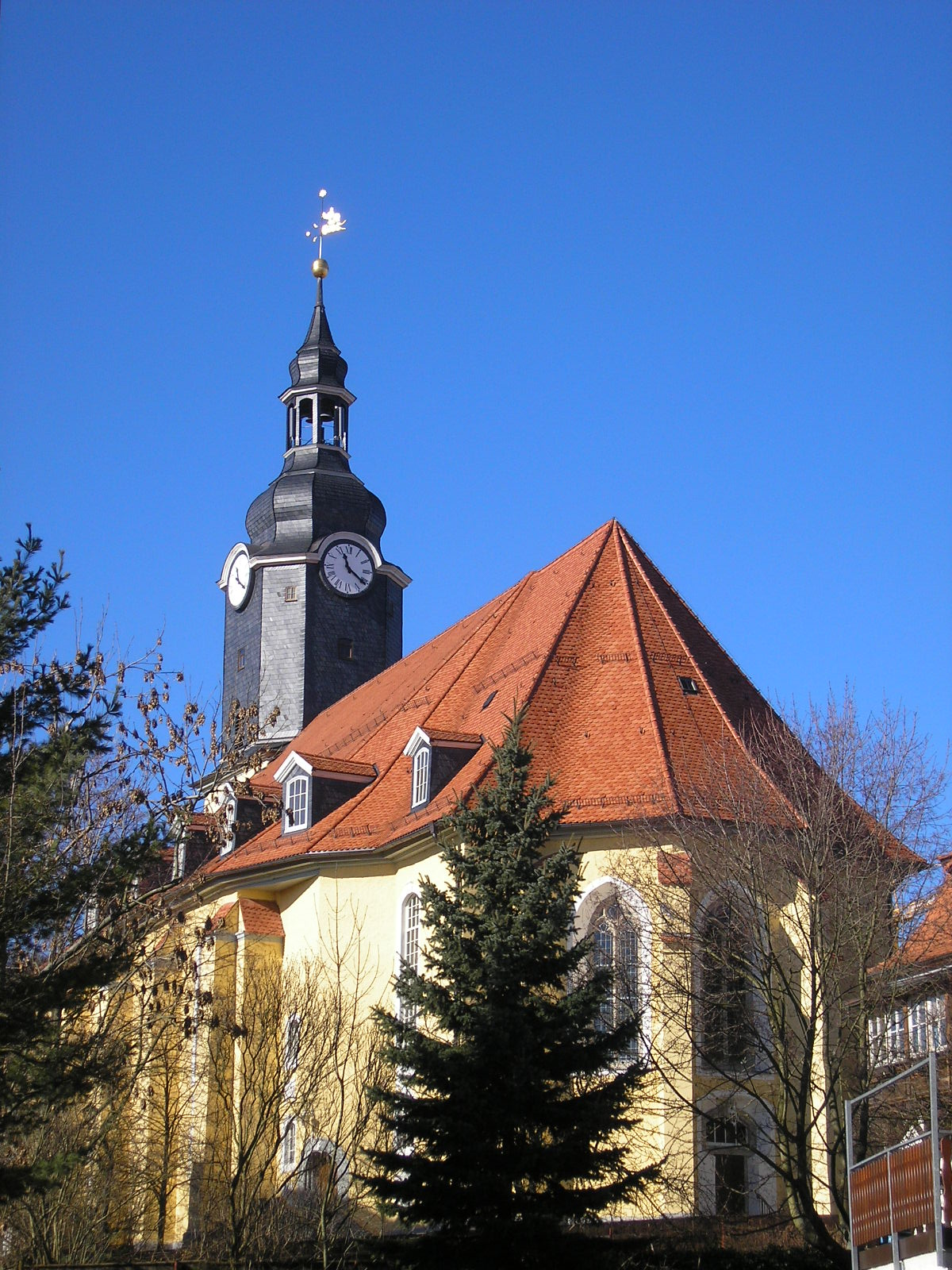
- View from east

- 50°41′08″N 10°54′55″E
- Location: Ilmenau, Ilm-Kreis, Thuringia
- Country: Germany
- Denomination: Lutheran
- Previous denomination: Roman Catholic
- Website: www.jakobuskirche-ilmenau.de

History
- Status: Parish church
- Founded: 12th century
- Dedication: James the Great
- Consecrated: 1761
- Events: Reformation in 1544, Burnings in 1603, 1624, 1752

Architecture
- Functional status: Active
- Style: Late Gothic, Late Baroque
- Completed: 1761 (nave); 1770 (tower)

Administration
- District: Arnstadt-Ilmenau
- Province: Protestant Church in Central Germany

The St.-Jakobus-Kirche (pronounced [zaŋkt jaˈkoːbʊsˌkɪʁçə], "St James Church") in the historical centre of Ilmenau, Thuringia, Germany, is a Lutheran parish church. The Ilmenau parish belongs to the Arnstadt-Ilmenau district of the Protestant Church in Central Germany. Colloquially, the St.-Jakobus-Kirche is called the Stadtkirche ("Town Church") for short. It houses the largest Romantic church organ in the state of Thuringia.

== Building description ==
The St.-Jakobus-Kirche is located in the heart of Ilmenau's old part of town. To the north is the church square with the Martin Luther candelabra. To the east of the church are the parish hall, parsonage and the church garden. The church building combines two styles: the eastern part with the choir is of late Gothic origin, whereas the western part with the 65-metre-high (213 ft) church tower is late Baroque. The nave and the lower part of the tower are made of sandstone, plastered and painted yellow. The tower superstructure is slated and the roof truss of the nave is covered with naturally red tiles. Several bells hang in the tower, all of which were cast in 1923 and are made of steel. The great bell ringing is daily at 7:00 am and 7:00 pm; these used to be the miners' shift change times.

== History ==
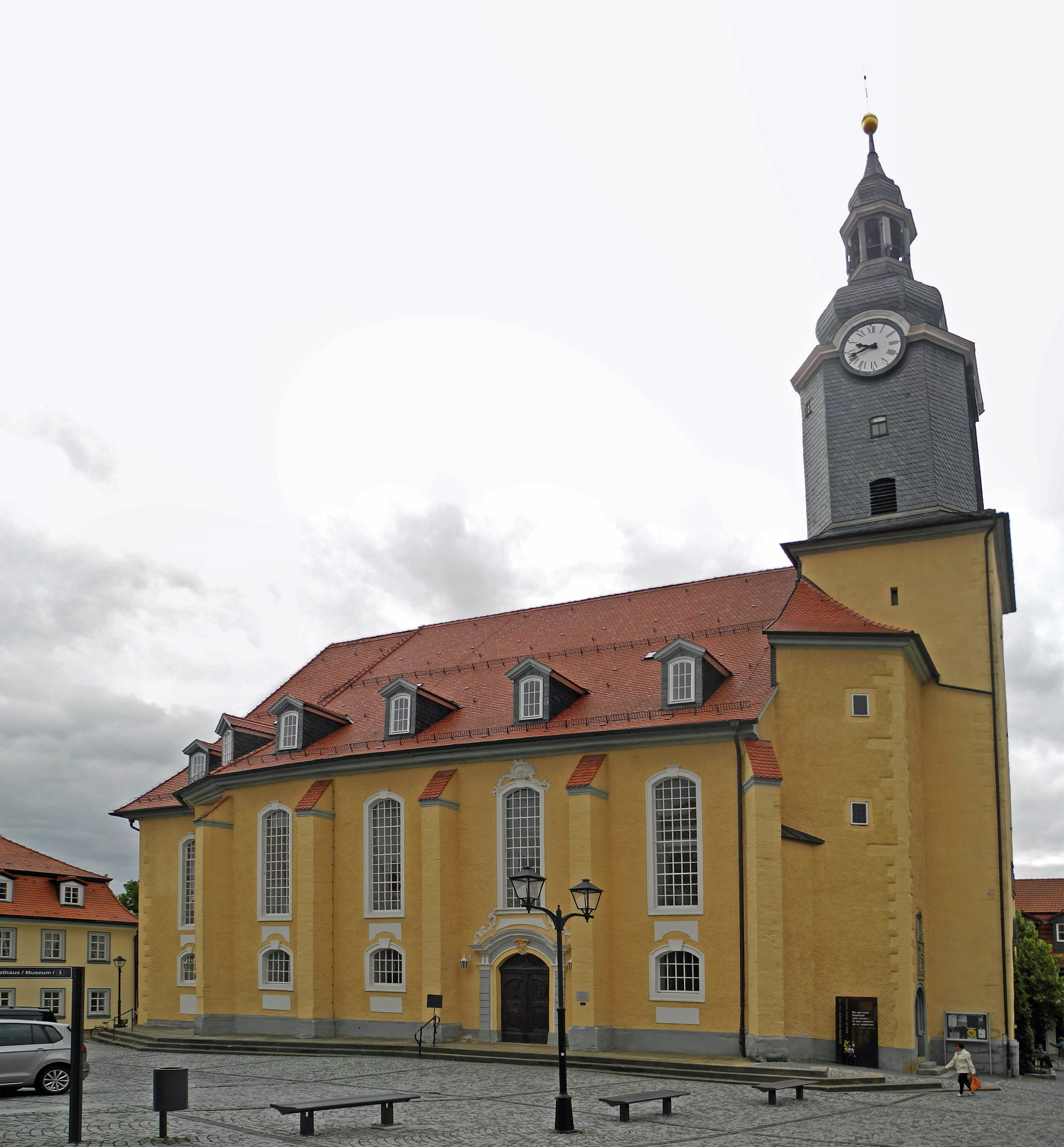
View from north

There have been several church buildings on the site of today's St.-Jakobus-Kirche. Ilmenau's first church was built in the 12th century as a Romanesque apse-hall church. It was replaced by a late-Gothic hall church in the middle of the 15th century. This church building fell victim to a town fire in 1603. The church was rebuilt, little changed, and stood only until 1624, when it was again destroyed by burning. A Renaissance church was built on the ruins of this church, albeit still with the late-Gothic choir room.

In 1544, the Reformation was introduced in Ilmenau. Since then, the parish has been Protestant.

The most devastating fire in Ilmenau's history occurred in 1752, when the church was almost completely destroyed. Only the lower part of the tower and the choir survived the fire. In order to save costs, these parts were to be included in the new building. Gottfried Heinrich Krohne was commissioned to plan the new building, but he died shortly afterwards. Due to a lack of money on the part of the Weimar dukes, the reconstruction of the church was put on hold in 1755. It was not until 1760 that the Weimar Duchess Anna Amalia took on the church. She provided money so that the reconstruction progressed quickly and the church could be consecrated as early as the first Advent in 1761. Between 1752 and 1761, the Ilmenau services were held in the Kreuzkirche (Cross Church) at the Ilmenau cemetery. The tower was not completed until 1770.

The demonstrations during the Peaceful Revolution in 1989 started from the St.-Jakobus-Kirche. A monument at the church commemorates: "To the victims of dictatorship 1945–1989. Autumn 1989 – peaceful revolution".

The St.-Jakobus-Kirche was extensively renovated from 1990 to 2006. On the 1st Sunday of Advent in 2006, a celebratory service was held to mark the completion of the interior and exterior renovation.

== Interior ==
The interior of the church is late Baroque in style, but due to the financial constraints at the time, it lacks the ostentation typical of the Baroque period. The interior has a two-storey gallery on each of the north and south sides. The baptismal font, altar and pulpit are arranged linearly in the choir room. The pulpit, which in contrast to the rest of the interior is very splendidly decorated, is an immediate eye-catcher.

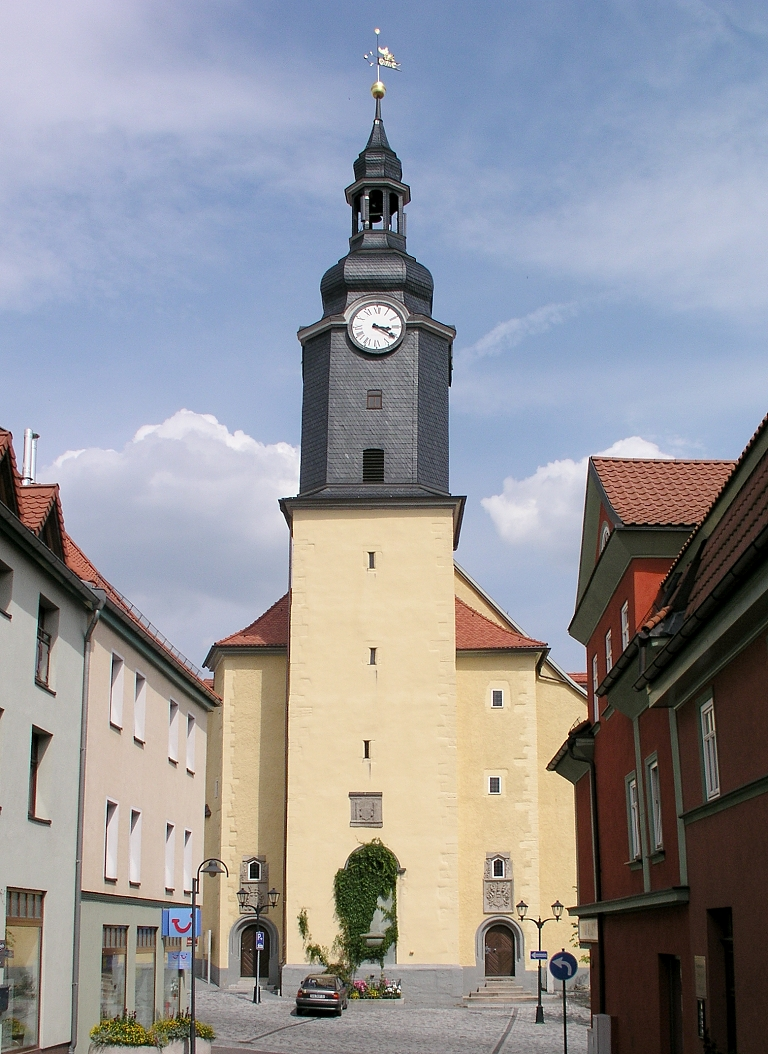
View from west

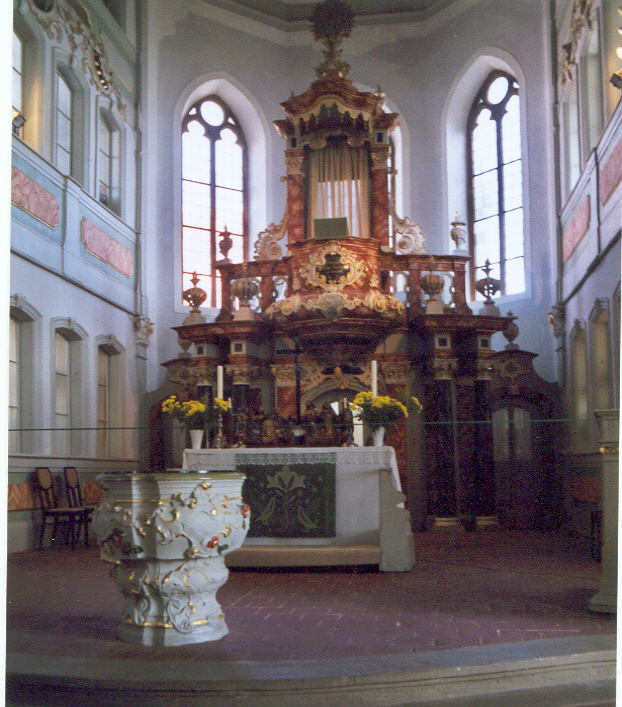
Choir

== Organ ==
Opposite the altar is the large organ. It was built in 1911 by the Walcker company from Ludwigsburg. With 64 stops on three manuals and pedal, it is the largest Romantic church organ in Thuringia. Ten metres (32 ft 10 in) high and seven metres (23 ft 0 in) wide, it has more than 4,500 pipes. On the occasion of the 100th birthday of the French composer Olivier Messiaen, his complete organ works were performed here during 2008. The instrument has electric actions. The organ was thoroughly cleaned and repaired in 2017 at a cost of €60,000 EUR. The work was carried out by the organ building company Christian Scheffler from Sieversdorf near Frankfurt/Oder.

I Main division C–f^{3}
1.	Principal	16′
2.	Bordun	16′
3.	Principal	8′
4.	Doppelflöte	8′
5.	Gedackt	8′
6.	Gambe	8′
7.	Gemshorn	8′
8.	Dolce	8′
9.	Octave	4′
10.	Rohrflöte	4′
11.	Gemshorn	4′
12.	Quinte	2 2/3′
13.	Octave	2′
14.	Cornett III–V
15.	Mixtur V
16.	Scharff IV
17.	Trompete	8′
18.	Cor anglais	4′

II Positive C–f^{3}
19.	Quintatön	16′
20.	Principal	8′
21.	Rohrflöte	8′
22.	Flauto amabilé	8′
23.	Quintatön	8′
24.	Salicional	8′
25.	Principal	4′
26.	Flauto traverso	4′
27.	Quinte	2 2/3′
28.	Piccolo	2′
29.	Mixtur IV
30.	Clarinette	8′
	Glockenspiel

III Swell C–f^{3}
31.	Lieblich Gedackt	16′
32.	Geigenprincipal	8′
33.	Lieblich Gedackt	8′
34.	Konzertflöte	8′
35.	Viola	8′
36.	Aeoline	8′
37.	Voix céleste	8′
38.	Flûte octaviante	4′
39.	Fugara	4′
40.	Flautino	2′
41.	Sesquialtera II	2 2/3′
42.	Cymbel III
43.	Basson	16′
44.	Trompête harm.	8′
45.	Oboe	8′
46.	Clairon	4′
	Tremulant

Pedal C–f^{1}
47.	Principalbass	16′
48.	Violonbass	16′
49.	Subbass	16′
50.	Bordun (= No. 31)	16′
51.	Harmonikabass	16′
52.	Quintbass	10 2/3′
53.	Oktavbass	8′
54.	Violon	8′
55.	Bordun	8′
56.	Violoncello	8′
57.	Zartbass	8′
58.	Principal	4′
59.	Cornettbass V
60.	Bombarde	32′
61.	Posaune	16′
62.	Basson (= No. 43)	16′
63.	Trompete	8′
64.	Clairon (= No. 46)	4′

- Couplers: II/I, III/I
  - Normal couplers: II/I, III/I, III/II, I/P, II/P, III/P
  - Super-octave couplers: II/I, III/I
  - Sub-octave couplers: II/I, III/I
