= War memorial of Céret =

War memorial by Aristide Maillol in Céret, France

The war memorial of Céret
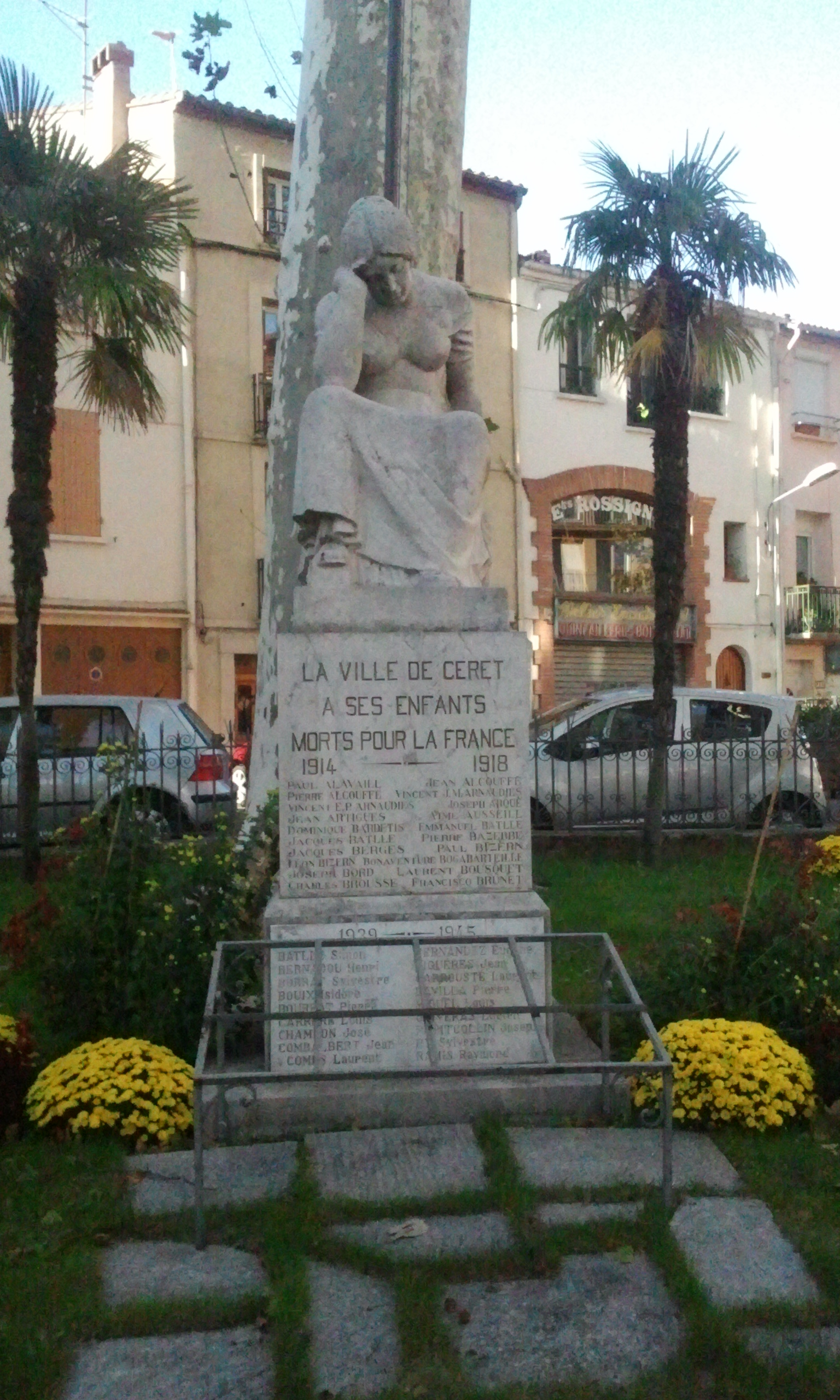
- Artist: Aristide Maillol
- Year: 1922
- Type: stone
- Location: Céret (Pyrénées-Orientales); 42°29′00″N 2°44′52″E
- Owner: commune

The War memorial of Céret is a World War I memorial in France, located in Céret (Pyrénées-Orientales). The memorial is made of light gray sandstone and consists of a symbolic figure of a mourning woman seated on top of an inscribed base. The figure was sculpted by Aristide Maillol, who worked on it from 1919 to 1920. The memorial was inaugurated in 1922, and it was declared a national monument in 1994.

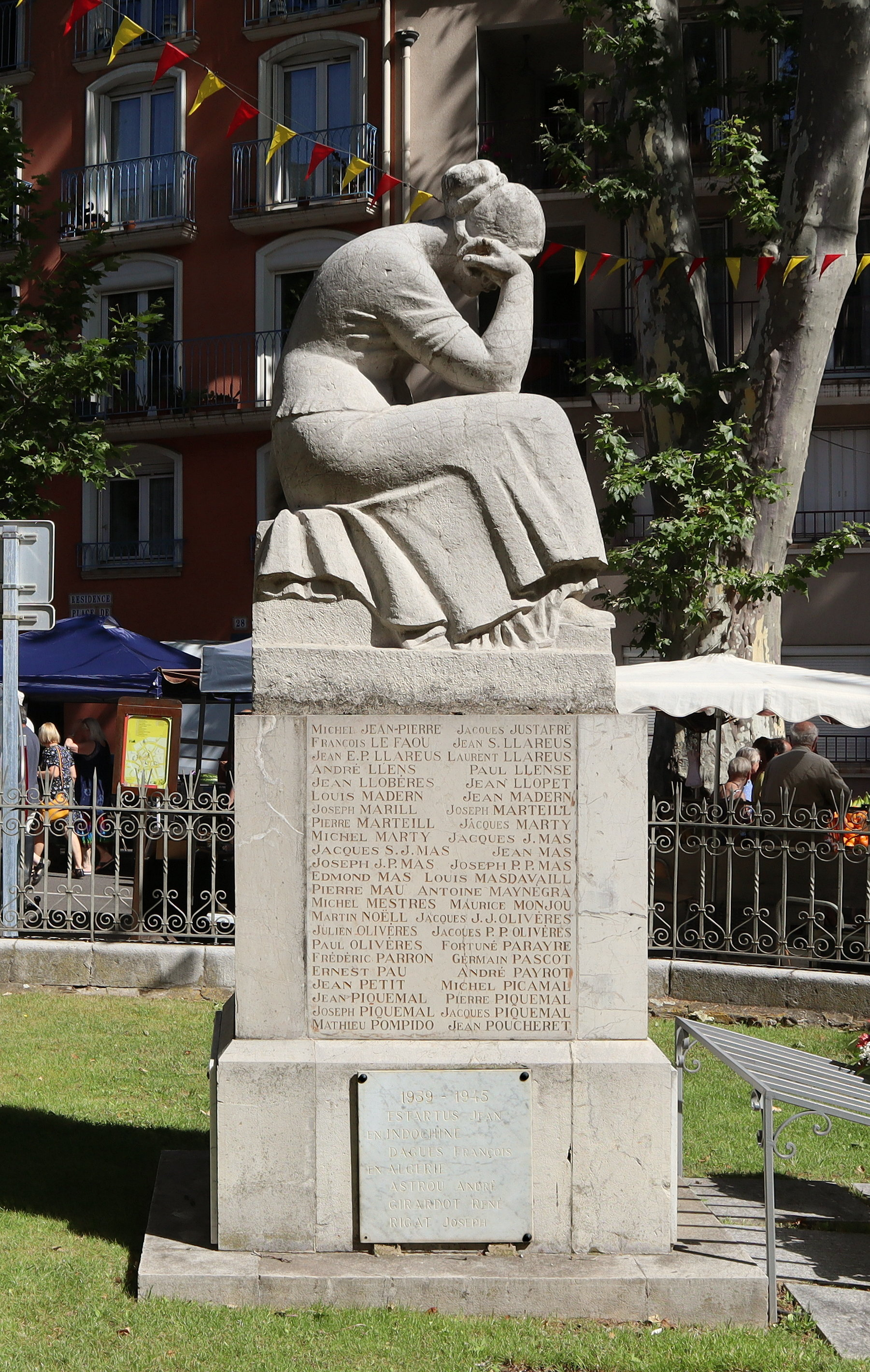
Side view
