= Céret =

Subprefecture of Pyrénées-Orientales, Occitanie

- Subprefecture and commune
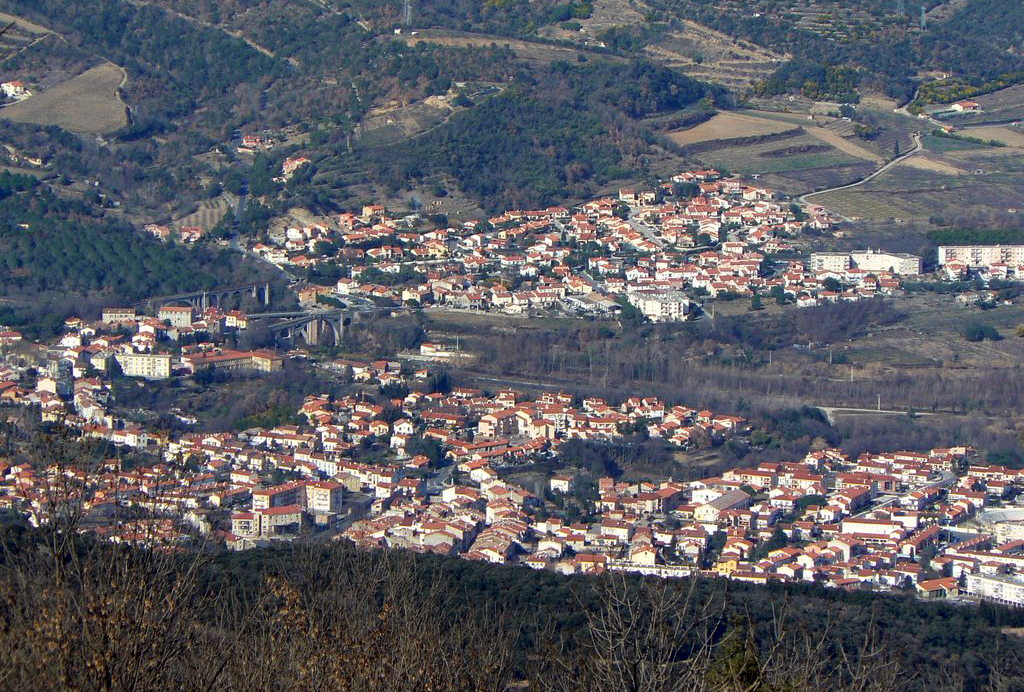
- Céret seen from Fontfrède

- Coat of arms
- Location of Céret
- Location within France Location within Occitanie
- Coordinates: 42°29′21″N 2°45′08″E
- Country: France
- Region: Occitania
- Department: Pyrénées-Orientales
- Arrondissement: Céret
- Canton: Vallespir-Albères
- Intercommunality: CC du Vallespir

Government
  - Mayor (2020–2026): Michel Coste
- Area^{1}: 37.86 km^{2} (14.62 sq mi)
- Elevation: 154 m (505 ft)
- Highest elevation: 1,440 m (4,720 ft)
- Lowest elevation: 107 m (351 ft)
- Population (2023): 7,521
  - Density: 198.7/km^{2} (514.5/sq mi)
- Time zone: UTC+01:00 (CET)
  - Summer (DST): UTC+02:00 (CEST)
- INSEE/Postal code: 66049 /66400
- ^{1} French Land Register data, which excludes lakes, ponds, glaciers > 1 km^{2} (0.386 sq mi or 247 acres) and river estuaries.

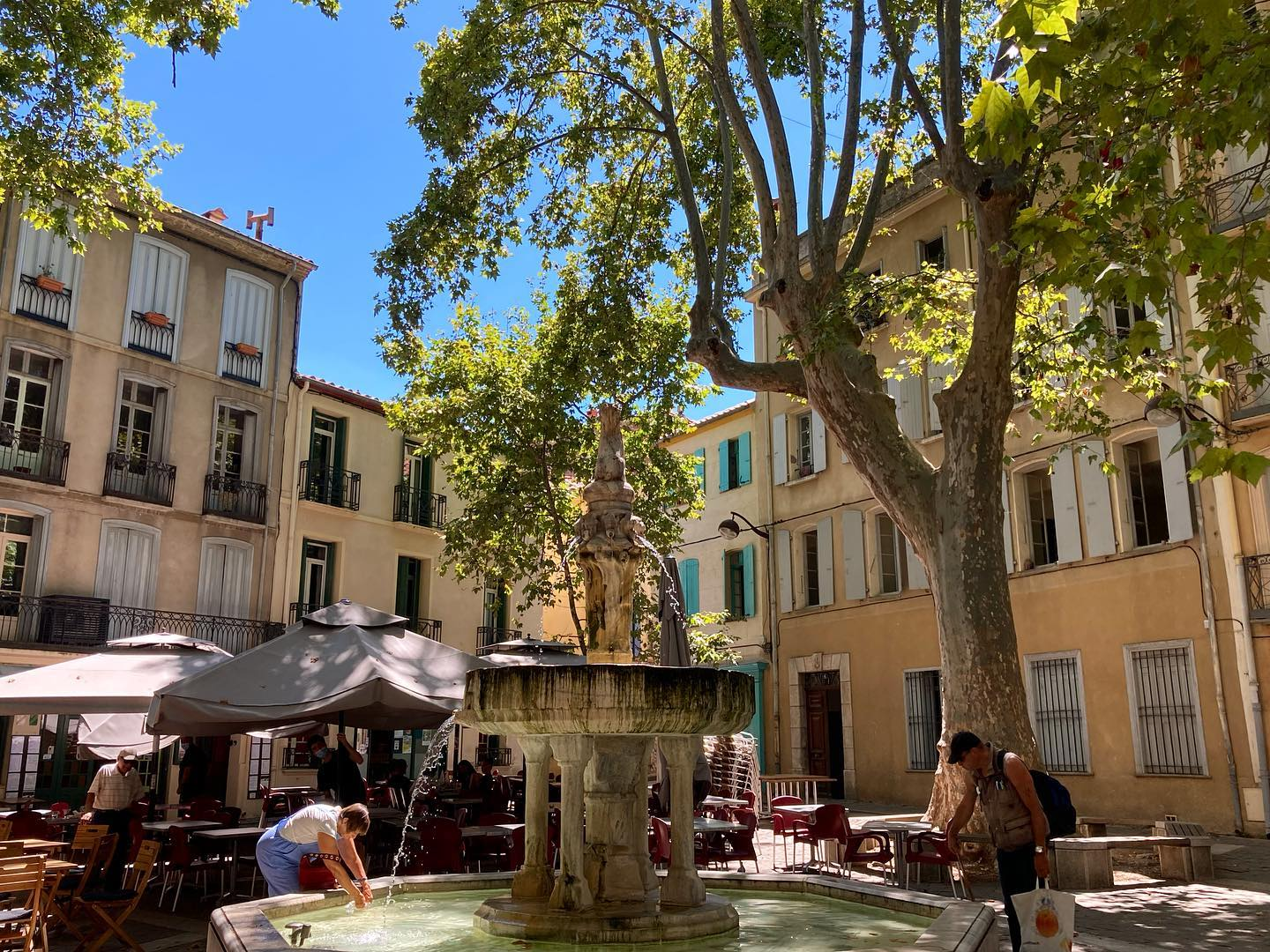
Square in Ceret

Céret (French: [seʁɛ]; Catalan: Ceret [səˈɾɛt]) is a commune in the Pyrénées-Orientales department in southern France. It is the capital of the historic Catalan comarca of Vallespir.

== Geography ==
The town lies in the foothills of the Pyrénées mountains, in southern France, on the river Tech at an altitude of 175–1400 meters. It is 7 km (4.3 mi) from the Autoroute A9, 200 km (120 mi) from Montpellier, 250 km (160 mi) from Toulouse and 180 km (110 mi) from Barcelona. The GR 10 footpath runs close by.

Céret is in the canton of Vallespir-Albères and the arrondissement of Céret.

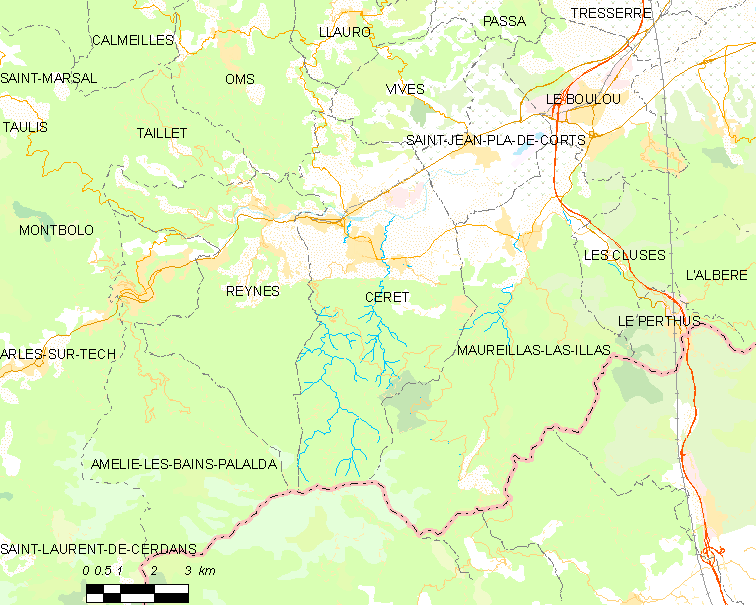
Map of Céret and its surrounding communes

== Toponymy ==
The name of the town in Catalan is Ceret.

Former known names of Céret are, in order of appearance, vicus Sirisidum in 814, vico Cereto in 866, villa Cerseto in 915, vigo Ceresido in 930, also Cered and Ceriteto in the 10th century, Ceret, Cericeto in the 11th and 12th centuries, Cirset around 1070, Cersed (one of the most common forms) in 1130 and Cerset in 1138, and from the 13th to 15th centuries Cereto, Ceret, Seret and Saret. Ceret becomes the most common form around the 16th century.

== History ==
A plague epidemic hit Céret from 1651 to 1655 and killed about a hundred people. One of the doctors in charge, coming from Thuir, was fired for being repeatedly drunk and after having buried several sick people that were still alive.

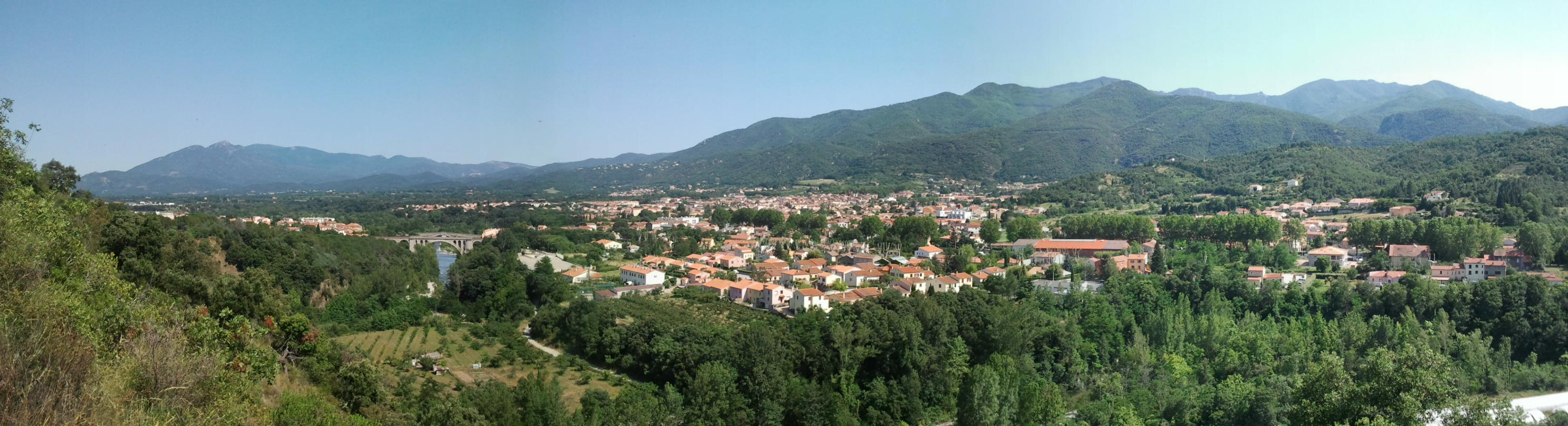
Céret seen from the north

== Government and politics ==
=== Mayors ===
Mayor	Term start	Term end
Onuphre Tarris	1919	1940
Henri Rey	1940	1941
Henri Mouchard	1941	1943
Jean Maler	1943	1944
Jacques Souquet	1944	1945
Gaston Cardonne	1945	1947
Henri Guitard	1947	1963
Marcel Parayre	1963	1964
Michel Sageloly Sr.	1964	1983
Henri Sicre	1983	1995
Michel Sageloly Jr.	1995	1996
Henri Sicre	1996	2001
Alain Torrent	2001	2020
Michel Coste	2020	

=== Twin towns ===
Céret is twinned with:

- Almonte, Spain
- Banyoles, Spain
- Lüchow, Germany

== Population ==
Historical population

Year	Pop.	±% p.a.
1793	1,754	—
1800	2,181	+3.16%
1806	2,517	+2.42%
1821	2,692	+0.45%
1831	3,251	+1.90%
1836	3,302	+0.31%
1841	3,313	+0.07%
1846	3,519	+1.21%
1851	3,586	+0.38%
1856	3,488	−0.55%
1861	3,585	+0.55%
1866	3,737	+0.83%
1872	3,708	−0.13%
1876	3,629	−0.54%
1881	3,777	+0.80%
1886	3,818	+0.22%
1891	3,828	+0.05%
1896	3,766	−0.33%
1901	3,840	+0.39%

Year	Pop.	±% p.a.
1906	3,841	+0.01%
1911	3,921	+0.41%
1921	4,472	+1.32%
1926	4,918	+1.92%
1931	5,052	+0.54%
1936	5,118	+0.26%
1946	5,148	+0.06%
1954	5,091	−0.14%
1962	5,421	+0.79%
1968	5,438	+0.05%
1975	5,987	+1.38%
1982	6,798	+1.83%
1990	7,285	+0.87%
1999	7,291	+0.01%
2007	7,620	+0.55%
2012	7,621	+0.00%
2017	7,798	+0.46%
2023	7,521	−0.60%

Source: EHESS and INSEE

== Economy ==
The region around Céret is a major fruit producer, in particular famed for its cherries.

In France since the 1920s, the first cherries of the season always come in march from the region of Céret, where the local producers always send, as a tradition since 1932, the first crate of cherries to the French president of the Republic. In 1938, 45000 out of the 90000 cherry trees of Pyrénées-Orientales are in the canton of Céret. The 25000 cherry trees in Céret only then give 1250 tons of cherries each year. In the 1960s, the production of cherries in Céret rises up to 3000 tons, before being divided by 11 at the end of the 2000s.

== Sites of interest ==
Official historical monuments

The Pont du Diable (Devil's Bridge) is a single arch stone bridge built between 1321 and 1341. With a single span of 45.45 m, it was at the time of its construction the world's largest arch bridge in terms of span length and remained so until 1356.

The church of Saint Peter is the main church in Céret and was built from the 11th to the 18th centuries.

The Château d'Aubiry is an Art Nouveau style château from the end of the 19th century built by rolling paper magnate Pierre Bardou-Job.

The War memorial was sculpted by Aristide Maillol and inaugurated in 1922.

Museums

Céret is famous for its Musée d'Art Moderne (Museum of Modern Art), which has numerous Picasso paintings, sculptures and ceramics, including the famous bullfighting bowl series. The museum also features paintings by Chagall, Matisse, Herbin, Soutine, many Fauves and a few Impressionists. The top floor of the Museum hosts touring exhibitions. The museum is closed on Tuesdays.

The Museum of Musical Instruments, Céret opened in May 2013 and is hosting a unique collection of instruments and musical scores.

== Culture ==
=== Bulls ===
Céret holds an annual festival for the corridas which run during three days. The first bullfighting with killing of the bull occurred in Céret in 1894 and has been a tradition ever since. This event is known as the feria. There are also bull runnings where young bulls (usually with their horns blunted) are run through the streets corralled by a group of horsemen and women. People wearing traditional white and blue (the Céret colors) outfits, chase from behind in an attempt to catch hold of the bull's tail and hold on for as long as they can. The feria is always held the weekend nearest to 14 July, Bastille Day and around 30 to 40,000 people participate in the streets each year.

=== Dances ===
Céret regularly holds communal dances, where local amateurs or professionals dance in a ring. The dance is known as the sardanes. No pre-arrangement is made on the dancers behalf, locals note the time and place on posters around the city and turn up as they wish. More formal arrangements are also made on other occasions.

=== Market ===
Céret has a market on Saturdays, where vendors sell mostly local produce, along with sausages, olives, cheese and wine. During the summer, there is also a market each Tuesday night that focuses on arts and crafts rather than produce.

== Notable people ==
=== Artists ===
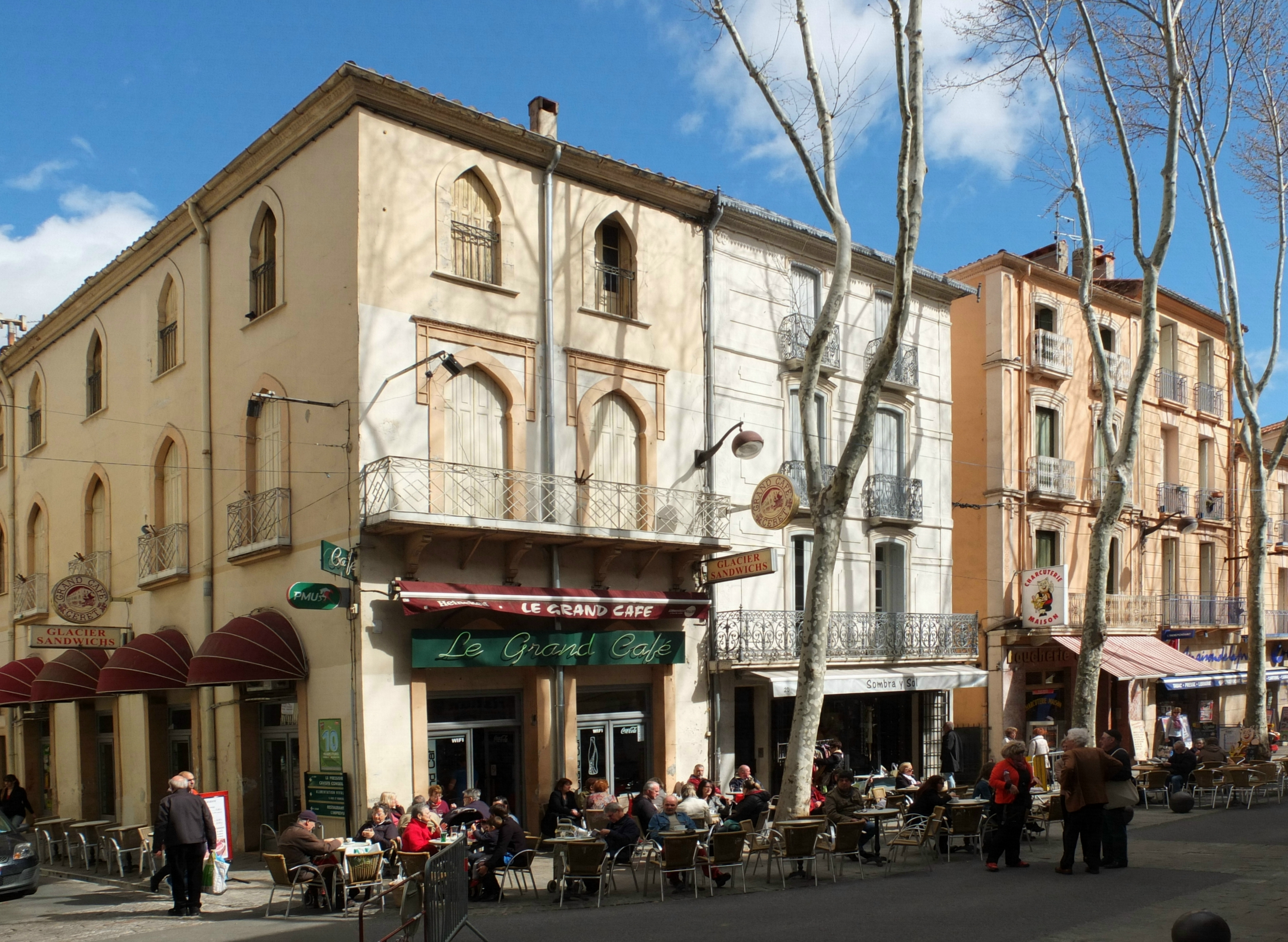
The Grand Café today

Céret has a continued tradition of being a home for artists, especially painters and poets. Pablo Picasso lived in Céret in the early part of the 20th century and Café Pablo in the town is dedicated to him. The Grand Café, still operating today, was a meeting place for many famous artists in the early part of the last century. Henri Matisse and Amedeo Modigliani, amongst other artists, visited at this time. Chaïm Soutine, the Russian emigre painter, lived in Céret for a period and painted many landscapes of the village and its surrounds. Aristide Maillol, a famous sculptor born in the local village of Banyuls-sur-Mer, is represented by two public sculptures - one outside the visitors information centre and the other on the war memorial. Harold Weston, the American modernist, lived in a farmhouse above Céret from 1926 to 1929.

- Pablo Picasso (resident 1911 - 1912)
- Georges Braque (resident 1911 - 1912)
- Georges Badin (1927–2014) : poet, painter and curator born in Céret.
- Aristide Maillol
- Chaïm Soutine (resident 1919-1922)
- Harold Weston (resident 1926-1929)

=== Other people ===
- Louis Companyo (1781–1871), physician and naturalist.
- François Jaubert de Passa (1785–1856) : engineer.
- Déodat de Séverac (1871–1921) : composer, lived and died in Céret.
- Edmond Brazès (1893–1980) : writer and poet both in Catalan and in French.
- Martin Fourcade (1988–) : biathlete.

== Gallery ==
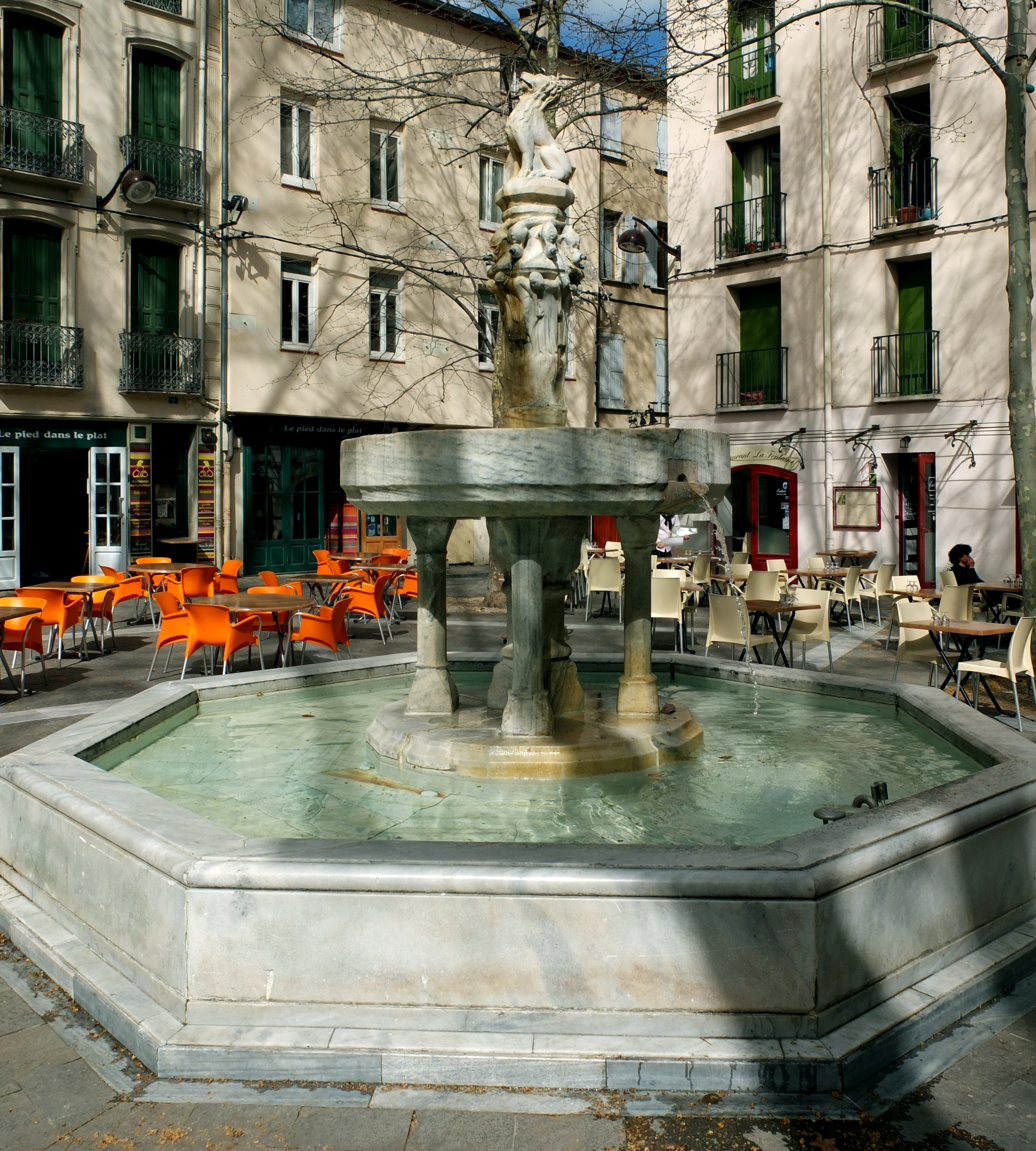

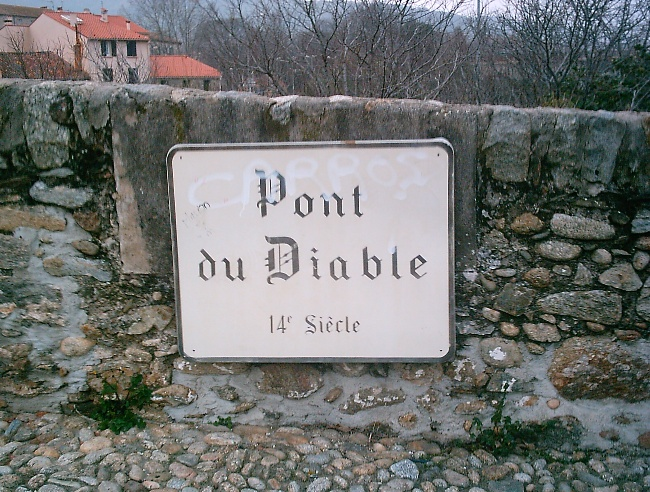

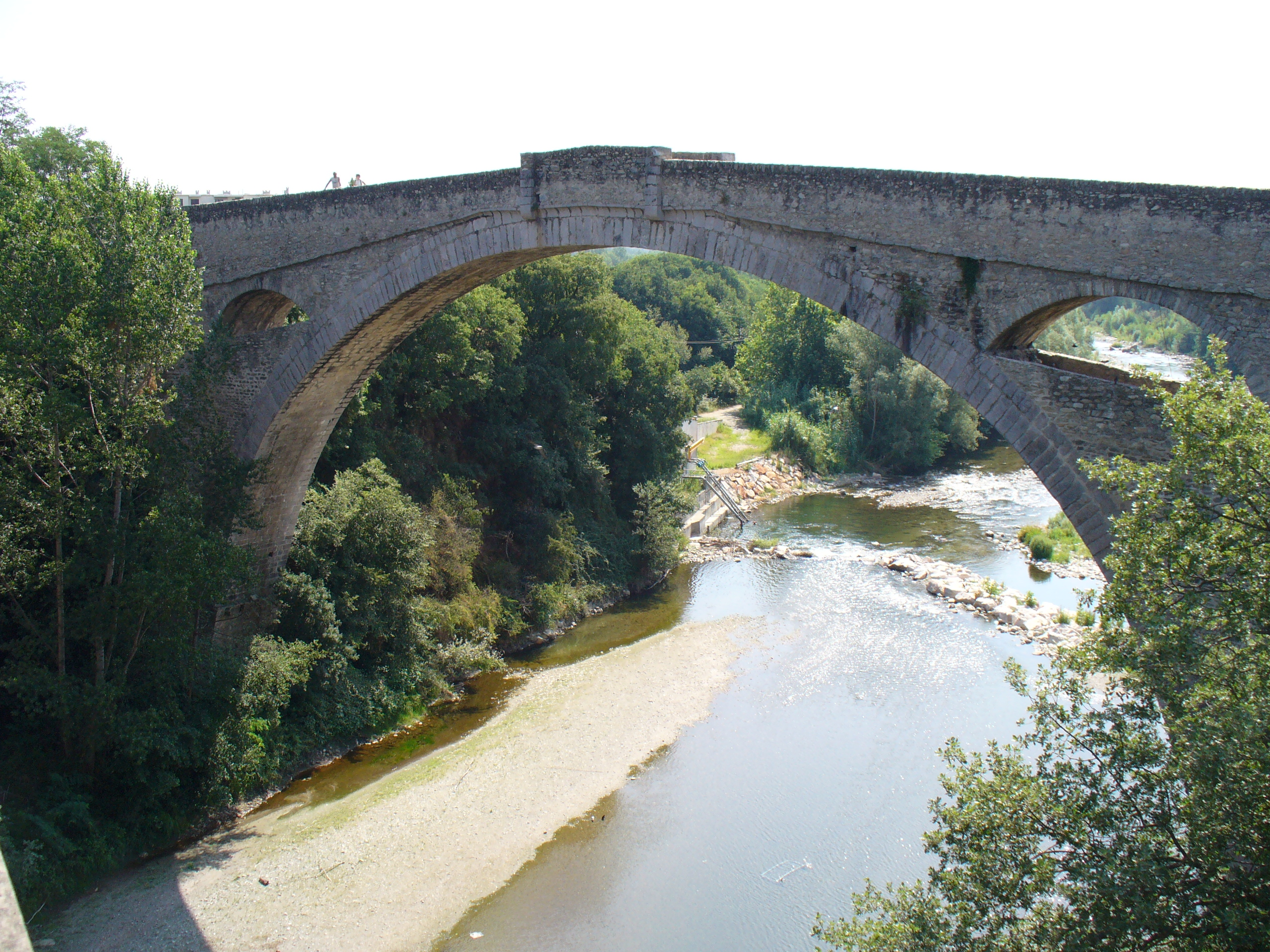

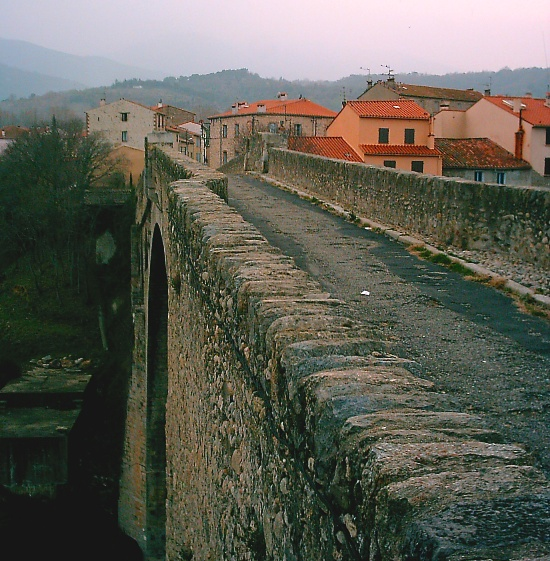

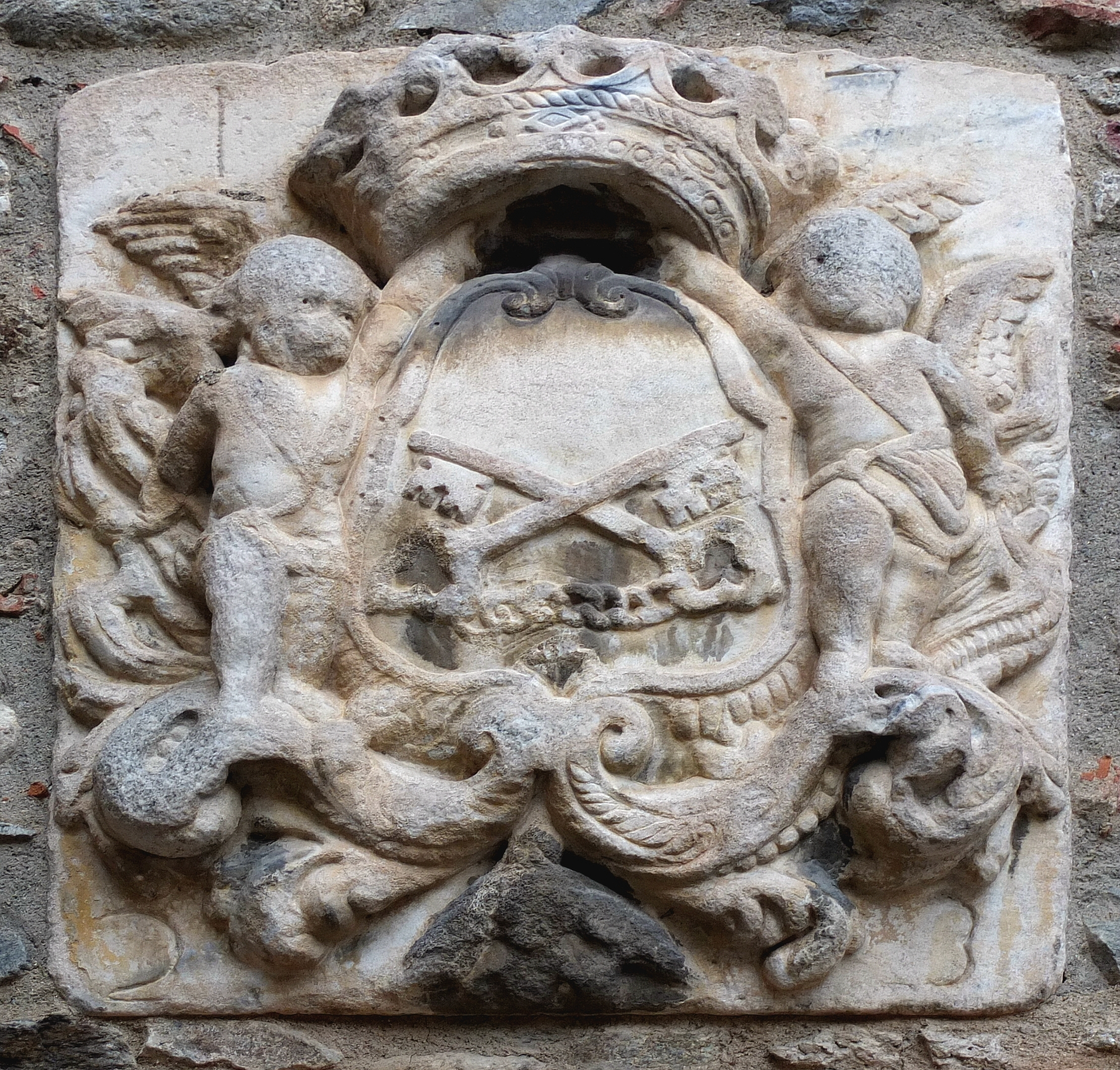

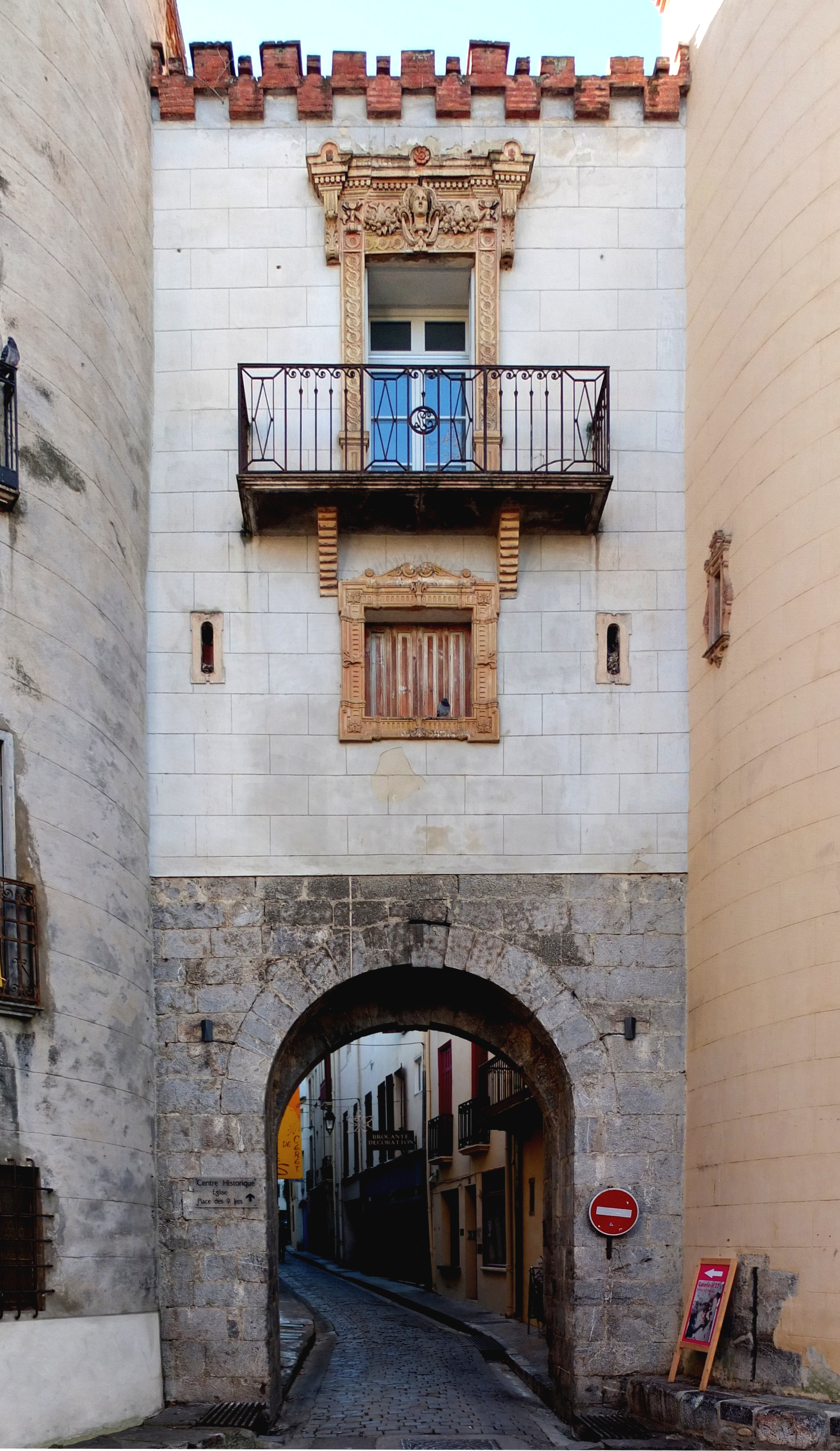

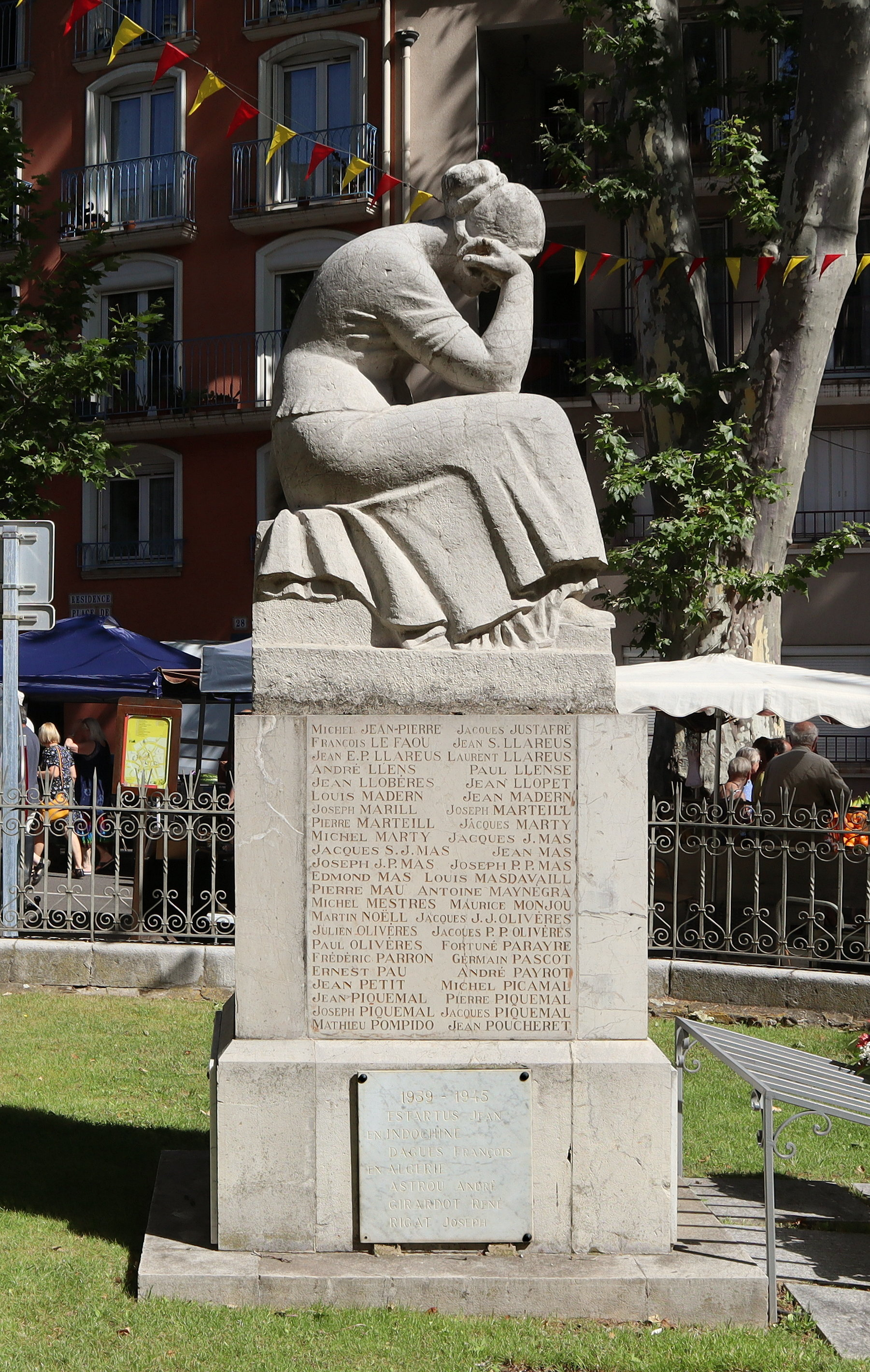

== See also ==
- Communes of the Pyrénées-Orientales department
