= Tremulant =

Pipe organ component which varies wind flow

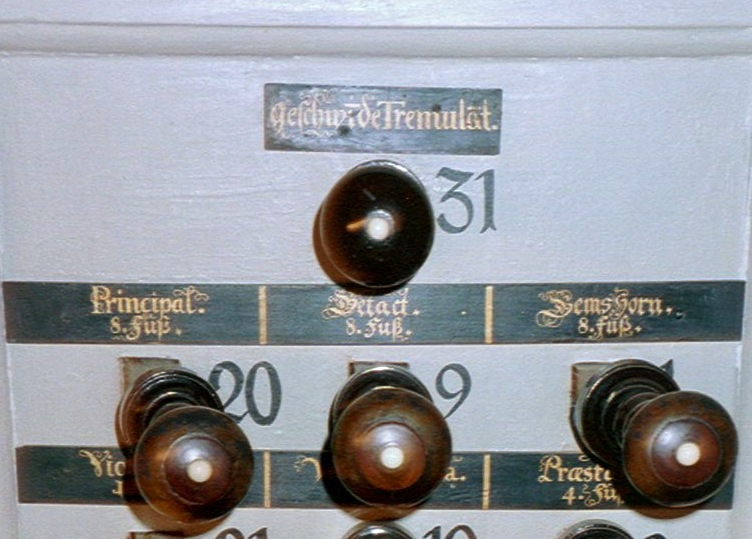
"Geschwinder Tremulant" (fast tremulant) stop on the Herbst-Orgel Lahm in Itzgrund (built in 1732).

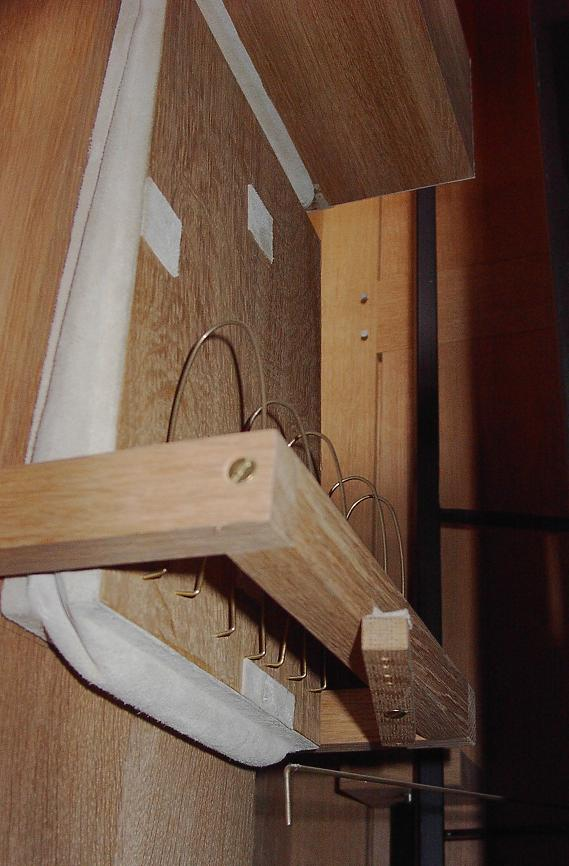
Tremulant using spring-loaded flap, on the Jens Steinhoff organ in Varna, Bulgaria

A tremulant (from Latin tremulus 'trembling'; French: tremblant, Italian: tremolo, Spanish: temblor) is a device on a pipe organ which varies the wind supply to the pipes of one or more divisions (or, in some cases, the whole organ). This causes their amplitude and pitch to fluctuate, producing a tremolo and vibrato effect. A large organ may have several tremulants, affecting different ranks (sets) of pipes. Many tremulants are variable, allowing for the speed and depth of tremolo to be controlled by the organist. The tremulant has been a part of organ building for many centuries, dating back to Italian organs of the sixteenth century.

The tremulant should not be confused with the celeste, which consists of two distinct ranks of pipes, one tuned slightly sharp or flat from the other, producing an undulating effect when they are used together.

== Construction ==
The simplest kind of tremulant is a weighted electric motor affixed to the top of the reservoir for the division. When activated, the spinning of the motor causes the reservoir to shake, altering the wind pressure. This type of tremolo appeared first in the twentieth century, when the electric motor became available.

The tremblant fort (French: "strong tremulant") allows an escape route for some of the wind in the wind trunk. The loss of wind creates the tremulant effect.

The tremblant doux (French: "gentle tremulant") was illustrated by Dom Bédos de Celles in his monumental L'art du facteur d'orgues. It consists of a spring-loaded flap that is mounted inside the wind trunk of a division. When the tremulant is engaged, the flap drops into the wind trunk and bounces as the wind passes by it. The spring allows the flap to rebound repeatedly back into the wind supply, which creates the undulation. Both the tremblant fort and the tremblant doux were commonly seen on German organs of the 17th and 18th centuries.

Austin Organs, Inc. builds a proprietary kind of tremulant for its Universal Windchest. The Austin tremulant consists of a large blade that spans the length of the windchest above the pipes. When the tremulant is activated, the blade turns on its longitudinal axis, disturbing the air over the sounding pipes and creating a tremulant effect. It does not affect the air pressure of the pipes. Normal tremulants cause pipes to go out of tune quicker.

Gallery: historical tremulant mechanism

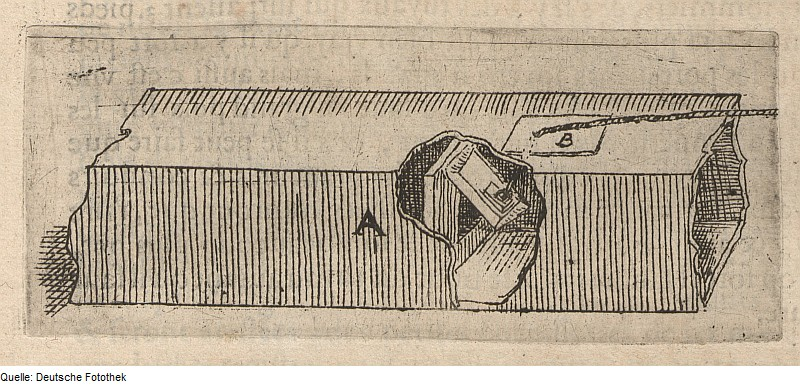
Tremulant mechanism (Salomon de Caus, 1615)

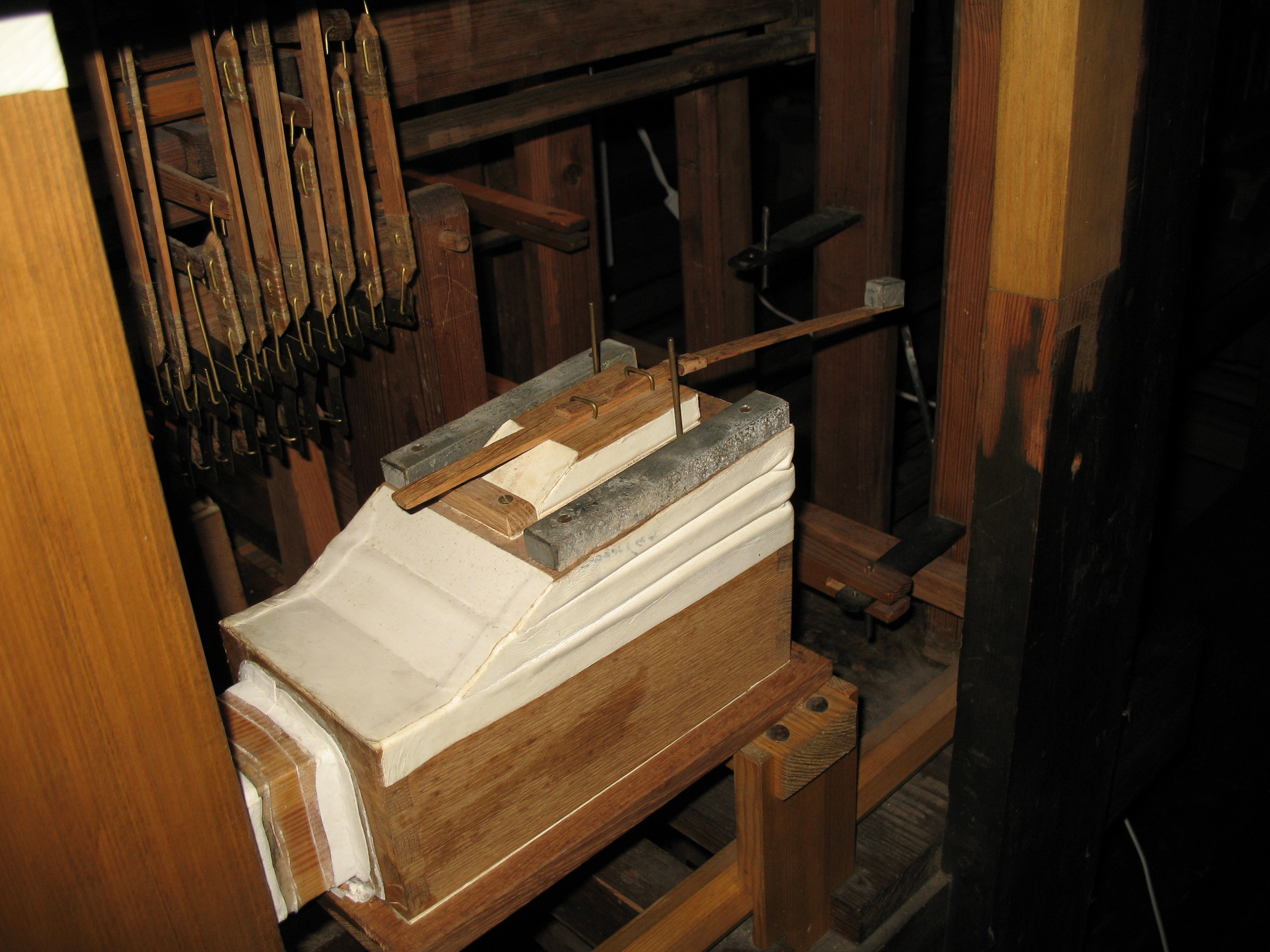
Wippfeder-tremulant (rocking spring-tremulant), built during 1848-60 by Arnold Rohlfs. (St. Magnus Church in Esens)

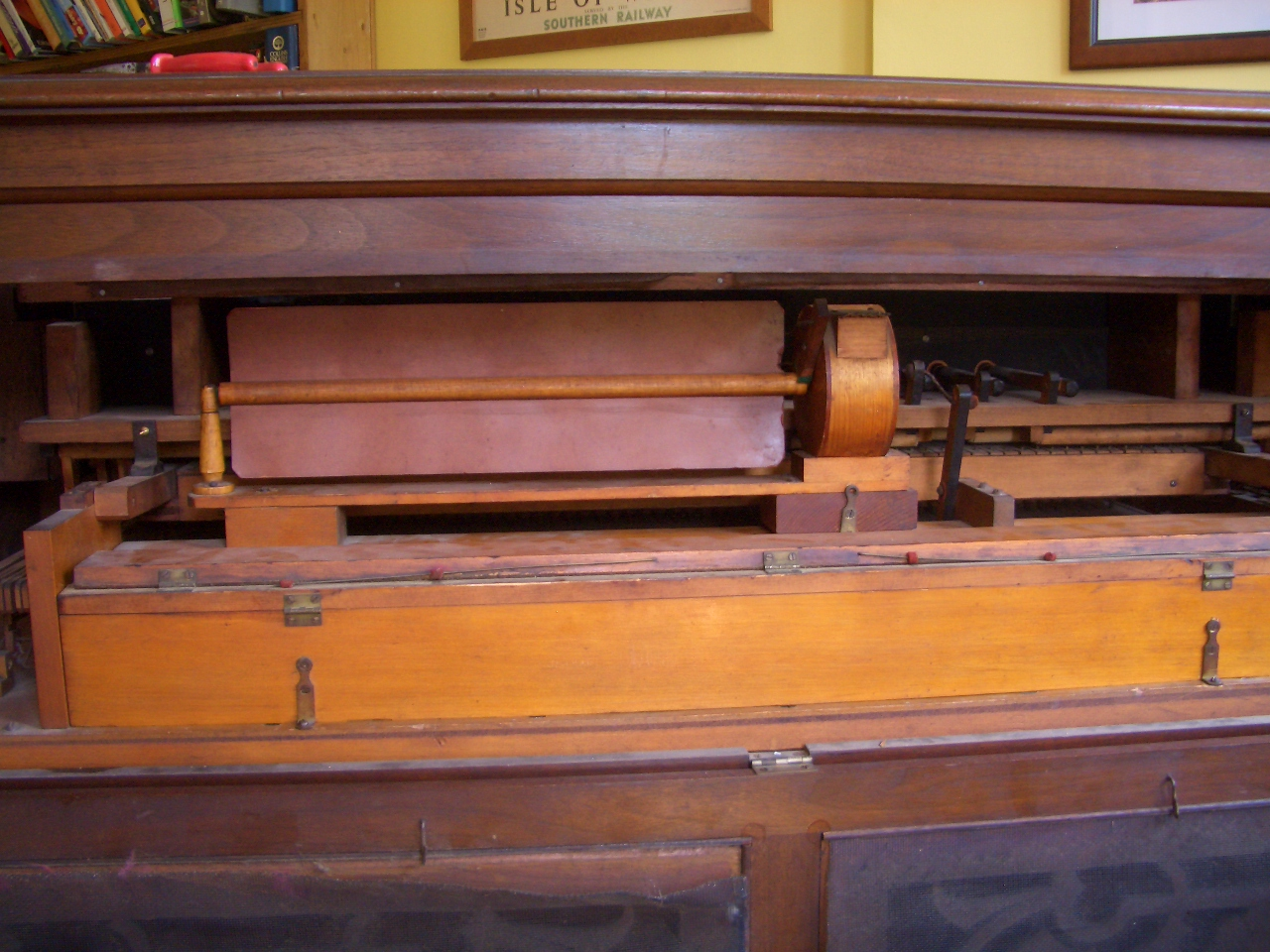
The interior of an 1895 Mason & Hamlin reed organ showing stop mechanism, swell case and Vox humana tremulant.
