= Museum of Musical Instruments, Céret =

Musée des instruments de Céret
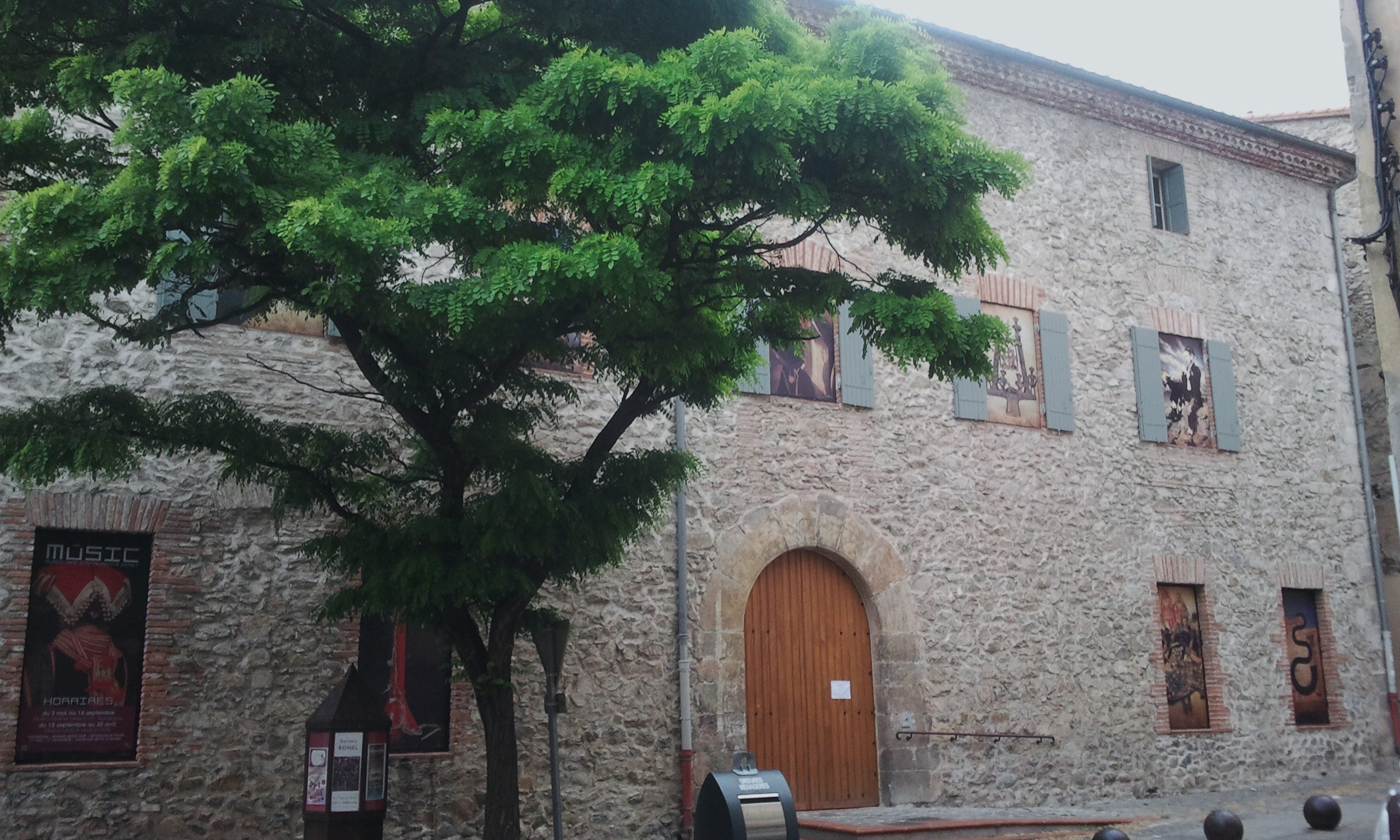
- The Museum of Musical Instruments
- Established: 2013
- Location: 14 rue Pierre Rameil, Céret, France
- Coordinates: 42.485035°N 2.749755°E
- Website: www.music-ceret.com

The Museum of Musical Instruments of Céret (French: Musée des instruments de Céret), also known as MúSIC, is located in Céret (Pyrénées-Orientales).

== The Building ==
The museum occupies the former Saint-Peter hospital, next to the Saint-Roch chapel.

== History ==
The history of the museum starts with the local sardana societies: the Foment de la sardane from Céret, led by Roger Raynal and Joseph Burch, the Fédération sardaniste du Roussillon (FSR), a collective of sardana societies from Pyrénées-Orientales founded in 1976, and the Institut de musique populaire et méditerranéenne (Popular and mediterranean music institute, IMPEM), as well created by Roger Raynal and acting beyond the borders of the department. On September 28, 1983, the town of Céret and the IMPEM signed an agreement to restore the former Saint-Peter hospital for future use by the sardana societies.

The Centre internacional de música popular (Popular Music International Center, CIMP) is founded in 1987. Led by Roger Raynal, its management includes representatives of both the town of Céret and the IMPEM. The CIMP becomes the new structure administrating the building with its collections.

The museum is inaugurated on May 18, 2013 by Jean-Pierre Bel, president of the French senate.

== The Collection ==
=== Instruments ===
The museum owns 2500 instruments and objects, of which about 400 are exhibited to the public. The specific feature of the collection is the important quantity of instruments from the oboe family, one of the largest collections in the world. These were collected over thirty years throughout the world by Heinz Stefan Herzka et Verena Nil and let to the town of Céret for the new museum. This collection added itself to the already existing collection of the CIMP, consisting mainly in traditional Catalan musical instruments.

=== Musical scores ===
The museum inherited from the CIMP a collection of 12000 musical scores for cobla, a type of Catalan traditional music ensemble found in Catalonia and in Pyrénées-Orientales.

== Gallery ==
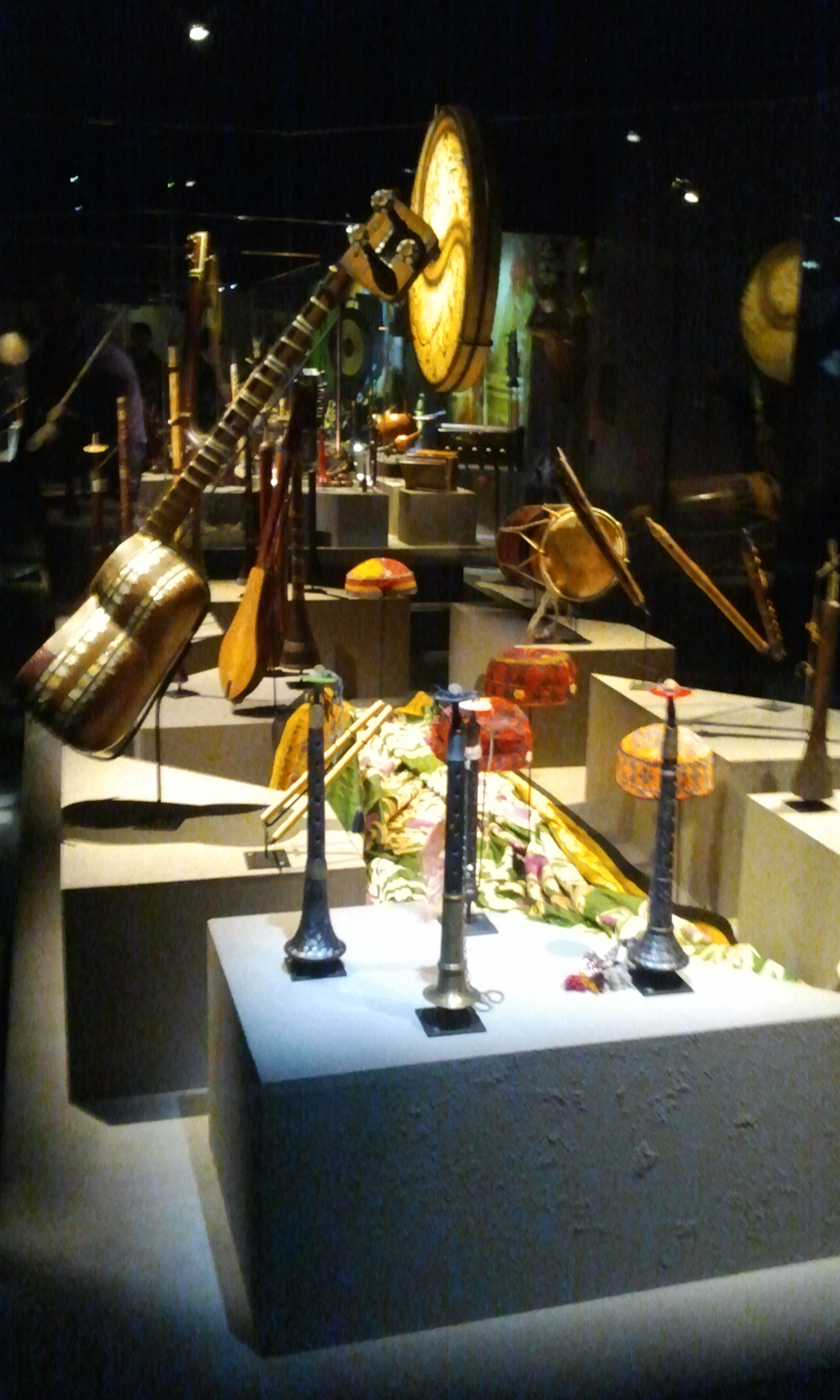

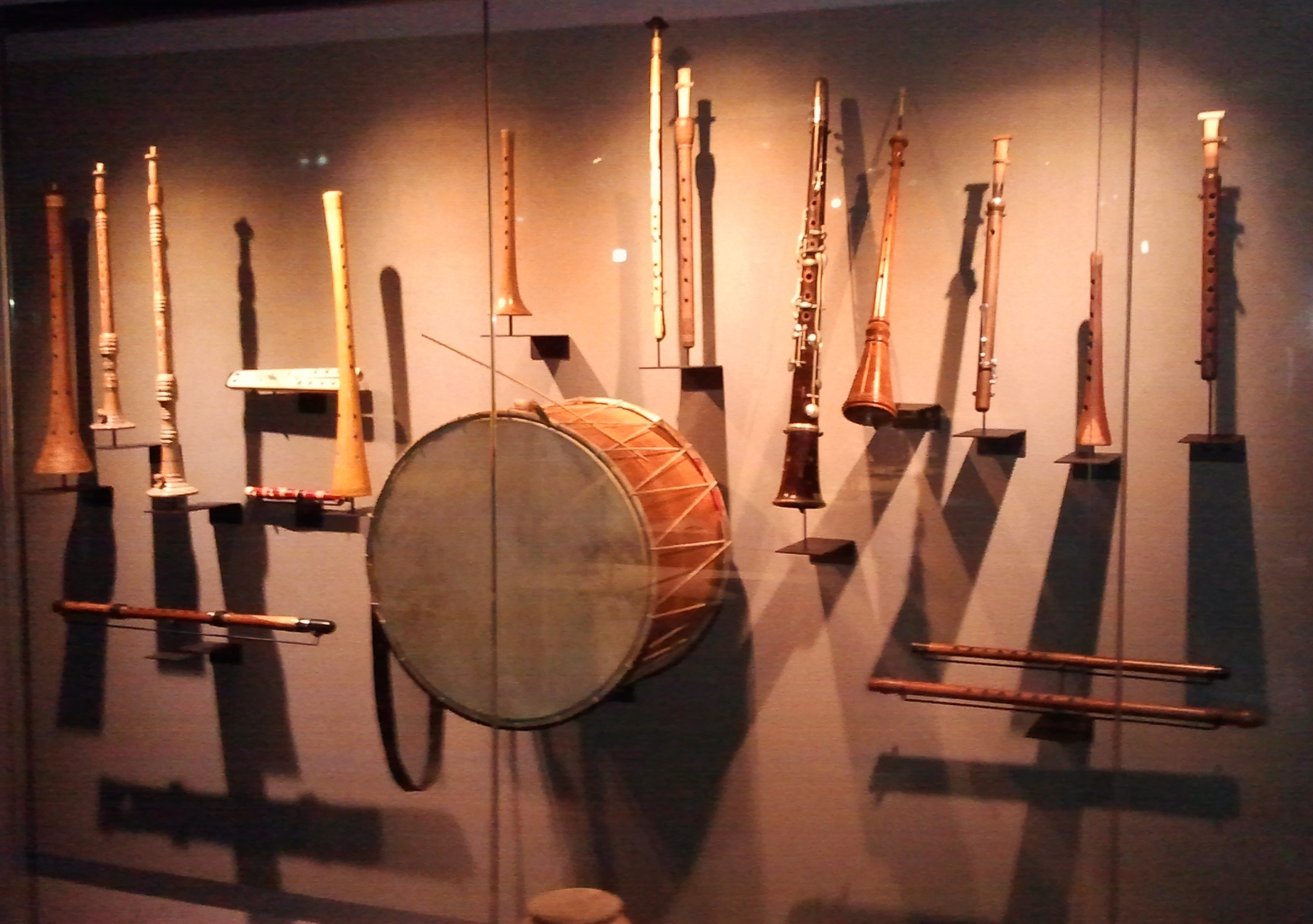

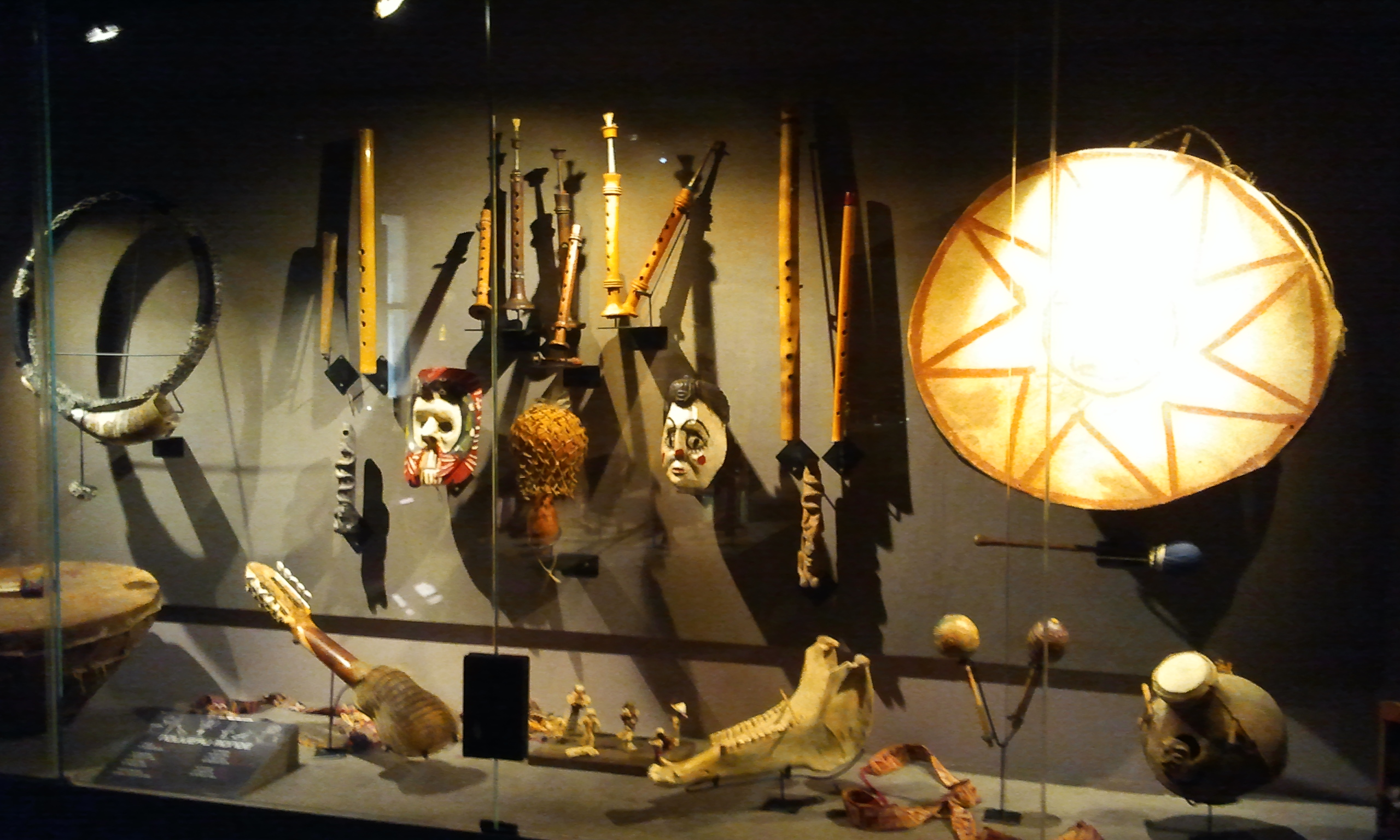

== See also ==
- List of music museums
