= Vox humana =

Stop in a pipe organ that resembles human voice

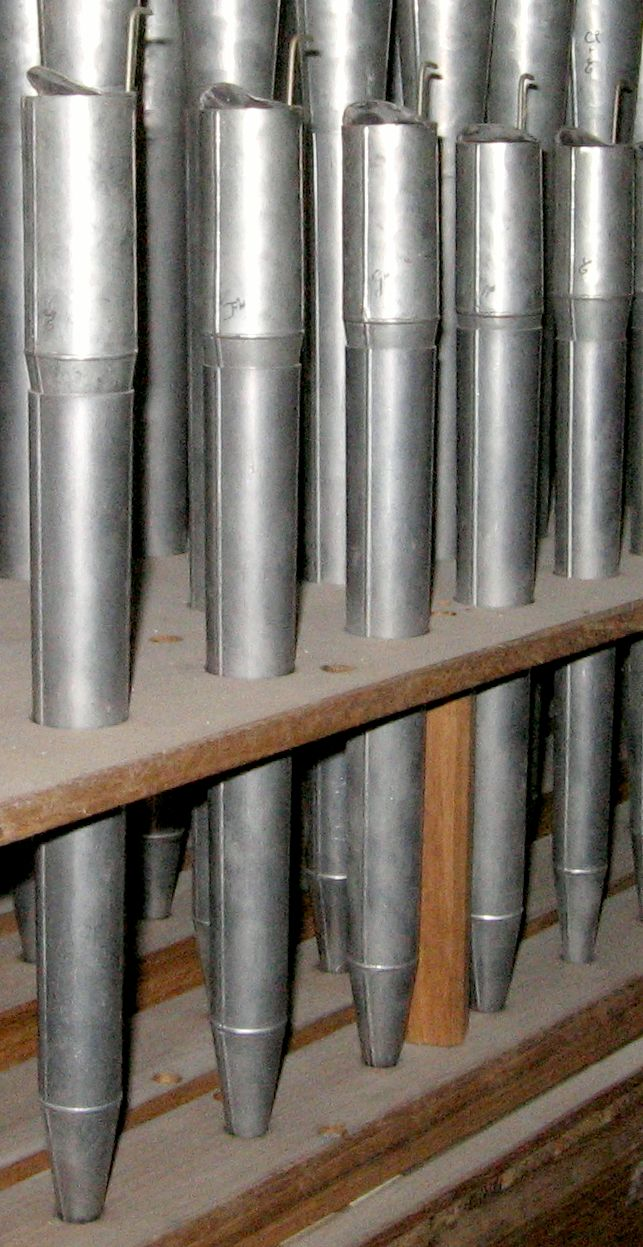
Vox humana pipes

The vox humana (from Latin 'human voice'; Spanish and Portuguese: voz humana; French: voix humaine; Italian: voce umana, also a term for a celeste stop, q.v.) is a short-resonator reed stop on the pipe organ, so named because of its supposed resemblance to the human voice. As a rule, the stop is used with a tremulant, which undulates the wind supply, causing a vibrato effect. The vox humana is intended to evoke the impression of a singing choir or soloist, though the success of this intent depends as much upon the acoustics of the room in which the organ speaks as it does upon the voicing of the pipes. It is almost invariably at 8 ft pitch, though on theater organs it is not uncommon to encounter a chorus of vox humana stops unified at 16 ft, 8 ft and occasionally 4 ft pitch on the Great manual and 8 ft and 4 ft pitch on the Accompaniment manual.

The vox humana is one of the oldest reeds in organ building, based on its appearance in very early instruments. It is common on French classical organs in the 17th and 18th centuries, where it was used as a solo voice. The vox humana also appears on German and Dutch organs of the period, though not as frequently as in France. French organs in the 19th and 20th centuries almost invariably featured a voix humaine in the Récit (the most commonly enclosed division of the French romantic organ), though by this time the literature had evolved and it was used to play rich, harmonic chordal progressions. Many American organs built in the romantic style include a vox humana in order to facilitate the playing of this literature.

Vox humana stops in very old organs had a fairly wide variety of designs and tonal qualities. It was during the nineteenth century that the design became fairly standardized. Today, most builders construct vox humana pipes in approximately the same way, though the scaling will vary between builders and according to the tonal style in which the organ is designed. The actual sound of the pipe is dependent upon the voicer, with an open "O" or a long "E" sound probably being the most common result.

== See also ==
- Voix céleste
- Pump organ
