= Voix céleste =

Organ stop detuned for beat effect

Vox coelestis
Sound sample

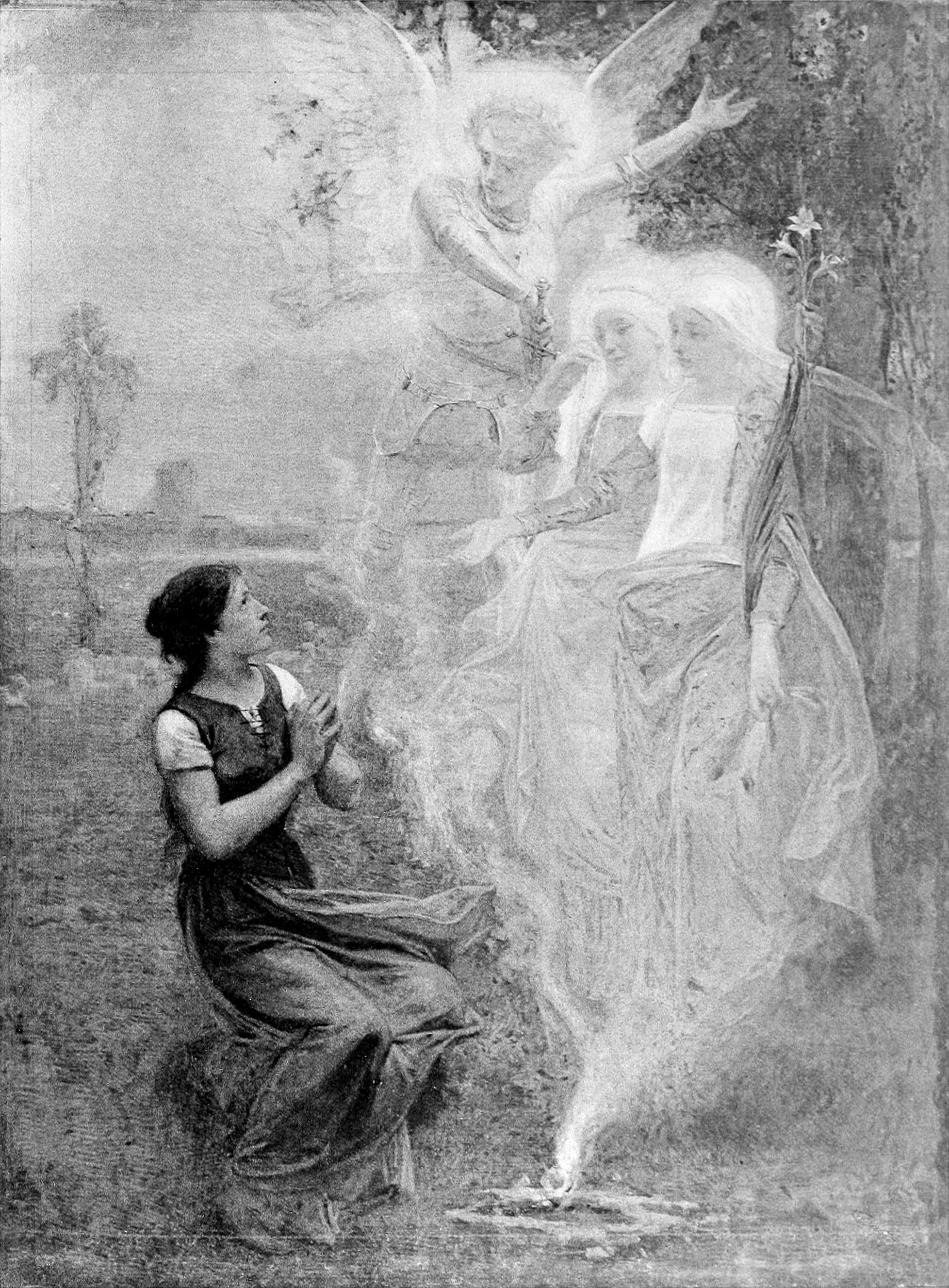
Jeanne d'Arc et les voix celestes by Diogene Maillart

The Voix celeste (French: Voix céleste, lit. 'heavenly voice') is an organ stop consisting of either one or two ranks of pipes slightly out of tune. The term celeste refers to a rank of pipes detuned slightly so as to produce a beating effect when combined with a normally tuned rank. It is also used to refer to a compound stop of two or more ranks in which all the ranks are detuned relative to each other.

The Voix celeste is typically located in the swell box. It is designed to be used in conjunction with a stop of similar tonal quality of its own, normally a Viola da gamba or Salicional. When both stops are played together an undulant, warm sounding string effect is generated. When proper organ terminology is used, "Voix Celeste" will always use string-voiced pipes. Frequently, both ranks of pipes required are placed on the same stop knob, and it is labeled as "Voix Celeste II". The celeste concept is extended to other types of organ voices (notably flutes) but they will be called by the name of the primary sound (e.g. "Spitzflöte Celeste").

A similar stop is the Unda maris, which is similar to the Voix celeste except that it typically uses a Dulciana or a softer-scale string (or even flutes), as opposed to the Voix Celeste which almost always refers to a brighter-scaled string celeste. The Voce Umana is an Italian variant of the celeste employing Principal pipes.

== See also ==
- Vox humana
- Chorus
