= Casavant Frères Ltée. Opus 1841 (Highland Arts Centre Organ) =

Pipe organ in Canada

Coordinates: 46°8′19.6″N 60°11′38.4″W

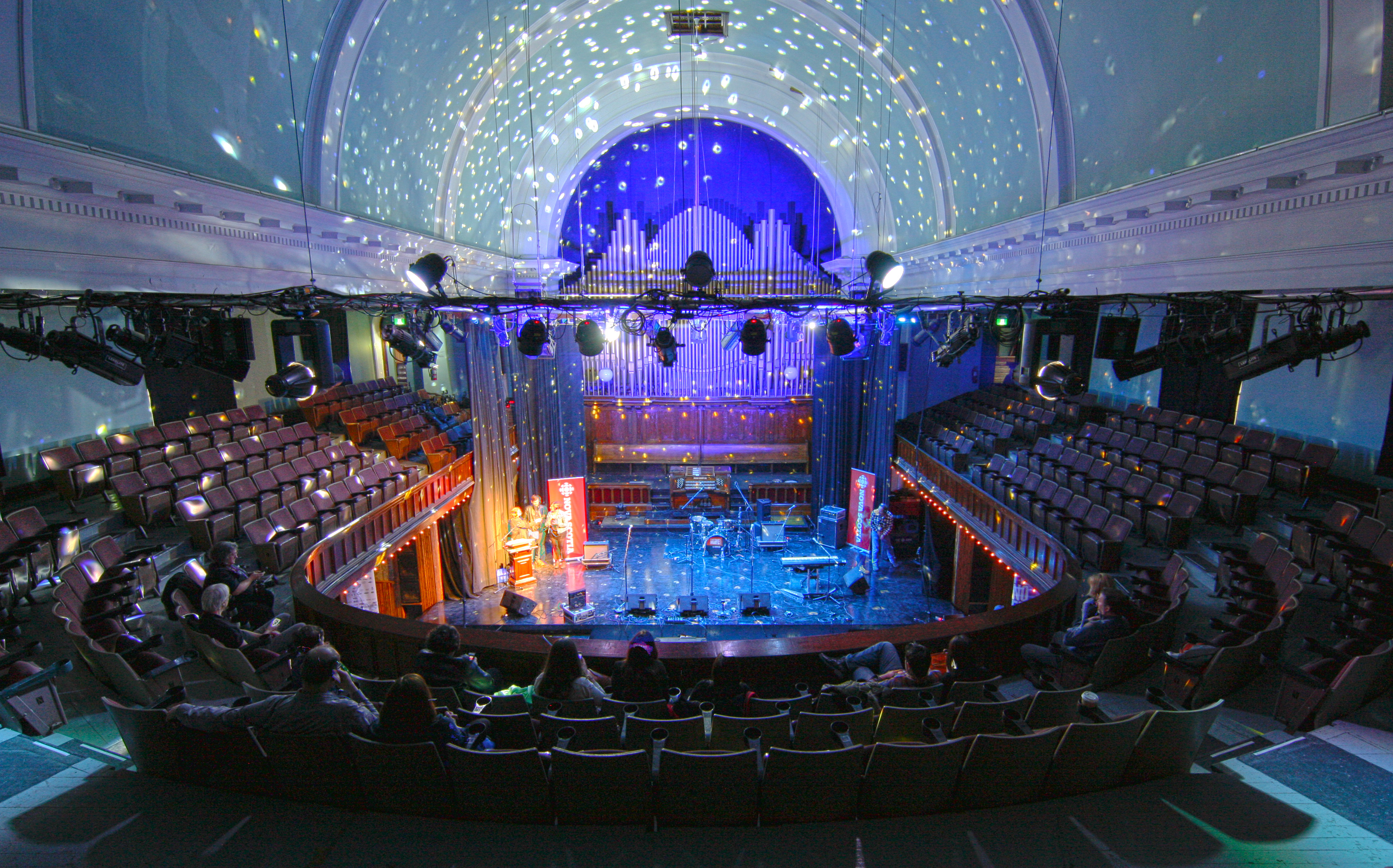
- Casavant Frères Ltée. Opus 1841

Background information
- Origin: Sydney, Nova Scotia, Canada
- Genres: classical, folk, popular, worship
- Years active: 1911–present
- Labels: Highland Arts Theatre
- Website: www.highlandartstheatre.com

Casavant Frères Ltée. Opus 1841 is a pipe organ built by the famous Casavant Frères of Saint-Hyacinthe, Quebec. The organ was first completed in 1911 as Casavant Brothers - Opus 452 for St. Andrew's Presbyterian Church at 40 Bentinck Street, Sydney, Nova Scotia, Canada. St. Andrew's later became St. Andrew's United Church and is now the Highland Arts Theatre.

Opus 1841 is presently composed of 33 speaking stops spread over three manuals and pedals. The 2,045 pipe organ is the largest such instrument on Cape Breton Island. The pipes range in length from 3/4 inch (19 mm) to 16 feet (4.9 m). Its facade, casing, pipes, swell and chorus boxes completely fill the apse of the theatre.

== History ==
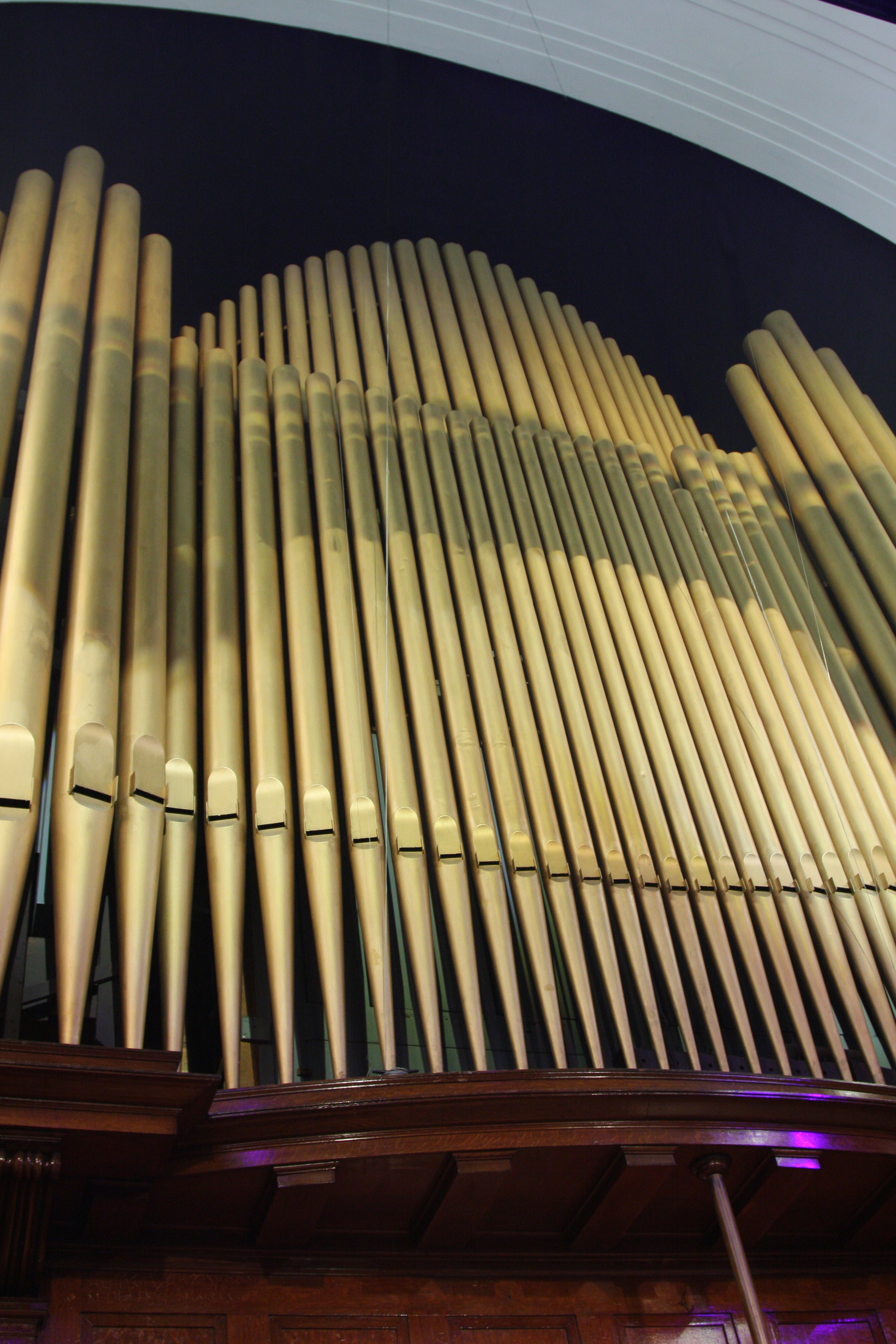
The Organ Façade, the rank of 61 pipes that make up the visible face of the organ upstage in the apse of the theatre. While a number of theses are dummy pipes solely for decoration, 30 are sounding pipes, making up part of two stops of the Great Organ, 12 as part of the Open Diapason 8' and 17 as part of the Violin Diapason 8'.

=== 1911 ===
Opus 452 was purchased for the new church, then under construction, in 1911 for $5,395. The original organ weighed over 13 short tons (12 t) and its specification was for three manuals, 4 divisions, 29 stops, 27 registers, 29 ranks, 1843 pipes. A Stoplist for the 1911 instrument copied from the factory specifications for Casavant Opus 452 1911 3/29, courtesy of the Casavant Frères Archives, St. Hyacinthe, Québec, Canada is available by following this link: Original Stoplist

=== 1946 ===
The organ was rebuilt in 1946 by Casavant Frères Ltée. as Opus 1841, at a cost of $7,600.00. Key- and stop- actions were partly electrified, three new Choir stops were added, a new traditional style console with roll top was supplied with three manuals, 4 divisions, 33 stops, 30 registers, 32 ranks, 2045 pipes. Manual compass is 61 notes, pedal compass is 32 notes. Equipped with electro-pneumatic (EP) chests, drawknobs in vertical rows on angled jambs, balanced swell shoes/pedals at standard AGO placement, adjustable combination pistons, AGO Standard (concave radiating) pedalboard, reversible full organ/tutti toe stud, combination action thumb pistons, combination action toe studs, coupler reversible thumb pistons, coupler reversible toe studs.

=== 1962/63 ===
In 1962 and 1963 further work was undertaken, some of the stops were taken back to the factory and re-cast, the Clarion 4' replaced the Vox Humana, the Trompette 8' replaced the Cornopean, & the Hooded Harmonic Trumpet replaced an earlier Trumpet on the Great Organ, with tonal changes (new pipework supplied) made by Casavant via Ledoux & MacDonald Organ Service Co., Halifax. New lead action tubing was provided for the pipes in the façade that sound. (The façade is not just a pretty face, 30 of those ornamental pipes actually make sounds.) Wind is supplied by a 3 hp electric blower located in the basement directly below the organ.

=== 1985 to 2005 ===
Over a twenty-year period nearly all the old action tubing was replaced with vinyl plastic tubing. For one small chest of 32 pipes which are used in two different departments of the organ, (duplexed), approximately one thousand feet of tubing had to be replaced.

=== 2008 ===
The 18-ton organ underwent $15,000 in repairs to its bellows in 2008, with the sheep skin seams being replaced by rubberized bellows cloth. The repairs were undertaken by Maritime Pipe Organ Builders Ltd. of Moncton, New Brunswick. The tubular chimes in the Swell Organ, now disconnected, were donated in about 1929 by the Lady's Aid group of the Church. They were activated by an electro-pneumatic action and were dis-connected from the wind supply during repairs to the bellows.

=== 2017 ===
In February 2017 Organ Tuner Jean-François Mailhot of Sydney Mines spent a week refurbishing Opus 1841, revoicing the reed stops (cleaning the reed tongues and shallots) of the swell organ: the 8' Trompette, the 8' Oboe, and the 4' Clarion, as well as the 16' Trombone of the Pedal Organ. At this time he also repaired a damaged facade pipe, part of the 8' Open Diapason stop of the Great Organ.

== Basic specification ==
- Builder: Casavant Frères Ltée, St. Hyacinthe, Québec, Canada
  - Opus No: 1841, Originally built by Casavant Brothers - Opus 452, 1911
- Console: traditional style console with roll top
  - 3 manuals
  - shoes/pedals, standard AGO placement
  - AGO Standard (concave radiating) pedalboard
- Stop controls: drawknob
- Speaking stops: 33
- Registers: 30
- Ranks: 32
- Pipes: 2045
- Wind:
  - Power: 3 hp electric blower

== Stoplist since 1962 tonal work ==
I - GREAT

(5^{1}/_{2}" wind)

Open Diapason	8′
Violin Diapason	8'
Doppelflöte	8′
Dolce	8′
Principal	4'
Super Octave	2'
Harmonic Trumpet	8'

Great Super
Chimes

II - CHOIR

(5^{1}/_{2}" wind) (Enclosed)

Salicional	8′
Melodia	8'
Viole d'Orchestre	8′
Waldflöte	4′
Nazard	2 ^{2}/_{3}'
Piccolo	2'
Clarinet	8'

Tremulant
Choir Sub
Choir Super
Chimes

III - SWELL

(5^{1}/_{2}" wind) (Enclosed)

Bourdon	16′
Open Diapason	8'
Stopped Diapason	8'
Viola di Gamba	8′
Viole céleste	8'
Aeoline	8′
Traverse Flute	4'
Piccolo	2'
Mixture III
Trompette	8'
Oboe	8'
Clarion	4′

Tremulant
Swell Sub
Swell Super
Chimes

PEDAL

(5^{1}/_{2}" wind)

Open Diapason	16'
Bourdon	16'
Gedeckt (Swell)	16'
Flute	8'
Stopped Flute	8'
Trombone	16'

- Couplers: I Great to Pedal, II Swell to Pedal, III Choir to Pedal, IV Great Super to Pedal, V Swell Super to Pedal, VII Choir Super to Pedal, VIII Swell Sub to Great, IX Swell to Great, X Swell Super to Great, XI Choir Sub to Great, XII Choir to Great, XIII Choir Super to Great, XIV Swell Sub to Choir, XV Swell to Choir, XVI Swell Super to Choir.

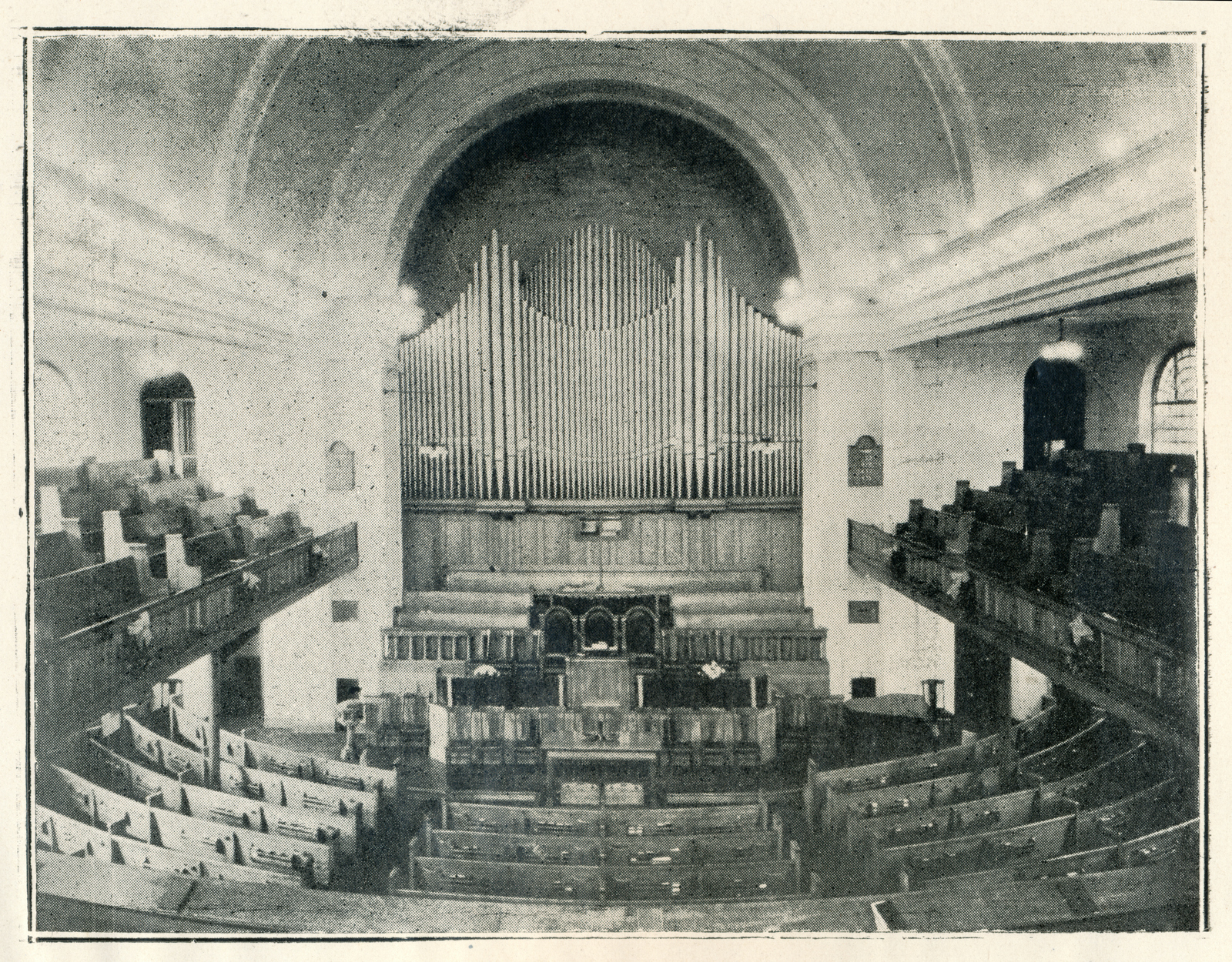
St. Andrew's Church Interior circa 1928 showing the prominent organ facade.

== Organists ==
- W. D. Fife was the organist when the church was being built, & signed the contract for the organ, but moved away before it was completed.

Other organists over the years were:

- A. F. MacKinnon
- Fred Liscombe
- Edward Stuart
- H. W. Sparrow
- William Raines
- John B. Neild just after WW I & at least well into 1925, (he was a Conference delegate to the first Maritime Conference meeting in 1925)
- William E. Fletcher
- R. MacK. Wiles
- A. J. McKnight
- Mrs. Frank Crossen
- W. D. Fife came back during WWII, signed the contract for the electrification & enlargement, then retired & moved to New Glasgow before it was finished.

He was succeeded by:

- Clifford L. Gates in 1946
- Vernon H. Atkinson in 1951
- S. Peter Fraser in 1964

== Concerts ==
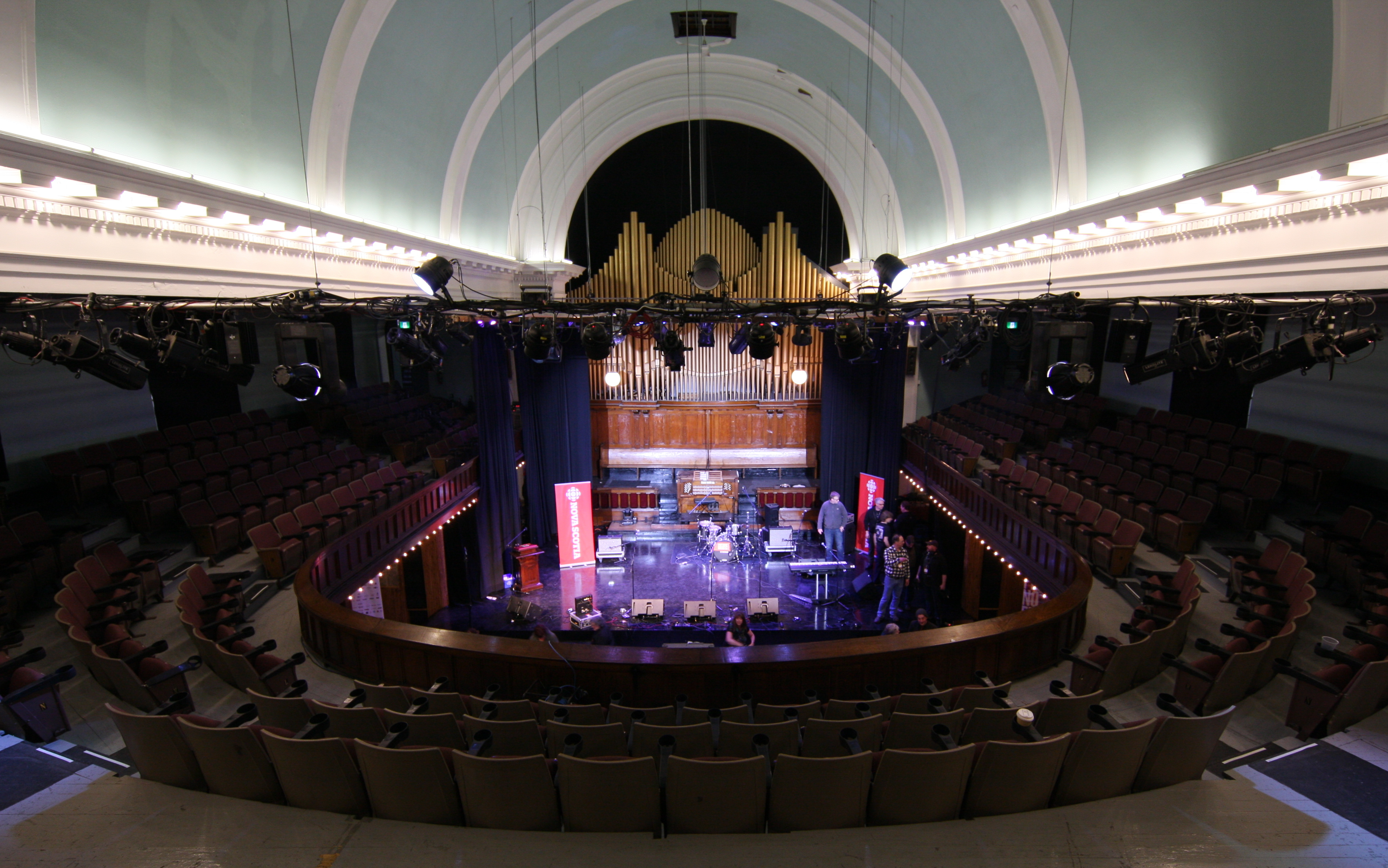
Highland Arts Theatre Casavant Frères Opus 1841 enclosed in the quarter dome of the apse at the end of the acoustic Barrel Vaulted Ceiling

While still serving as a church, St. Andrew's was considered to be perhaps the finest concert venue in the city of Sydney. Before its rebirth as an arts centre, the building had a distinguished background as a performance space. St. Andrew's Choir presented many cantatas over the years and massed choirs from eight of Sydney's churches assembled in St. Andrew's to sing as individual choirs and as a group the new and old Christmas carols. Radio broadcasts of Classical musicians regularly held recitals and concerts there over the years because of the building's outstanding acoustical properties and its Casavant Freres organ. In the mid-1950s St. Andrew's was a regular stop for one of the incarnations of the Halifax Symphony Orchestra whose performances at St. Andrew's were broadcast regionally and even nationally by CBC Radio. Thomas Mayer was the conductor. He would often invite local performers to join them, at the time there were several operatic sopranos and mezzo-sopranos from Cape Breton who gained a national following because of these broadcasts. More recently, due to its seating capacity of over 1,000, and excellent acoustics it was sought after by organizations such as Celtic Colours, The Barra MacNeils, and the Cape Breton Chorale.

== Gallery ==
Highland Arts Theatre 2,045 pipe, three-manual Casavant Frères Opus 1841 Pipe Organ

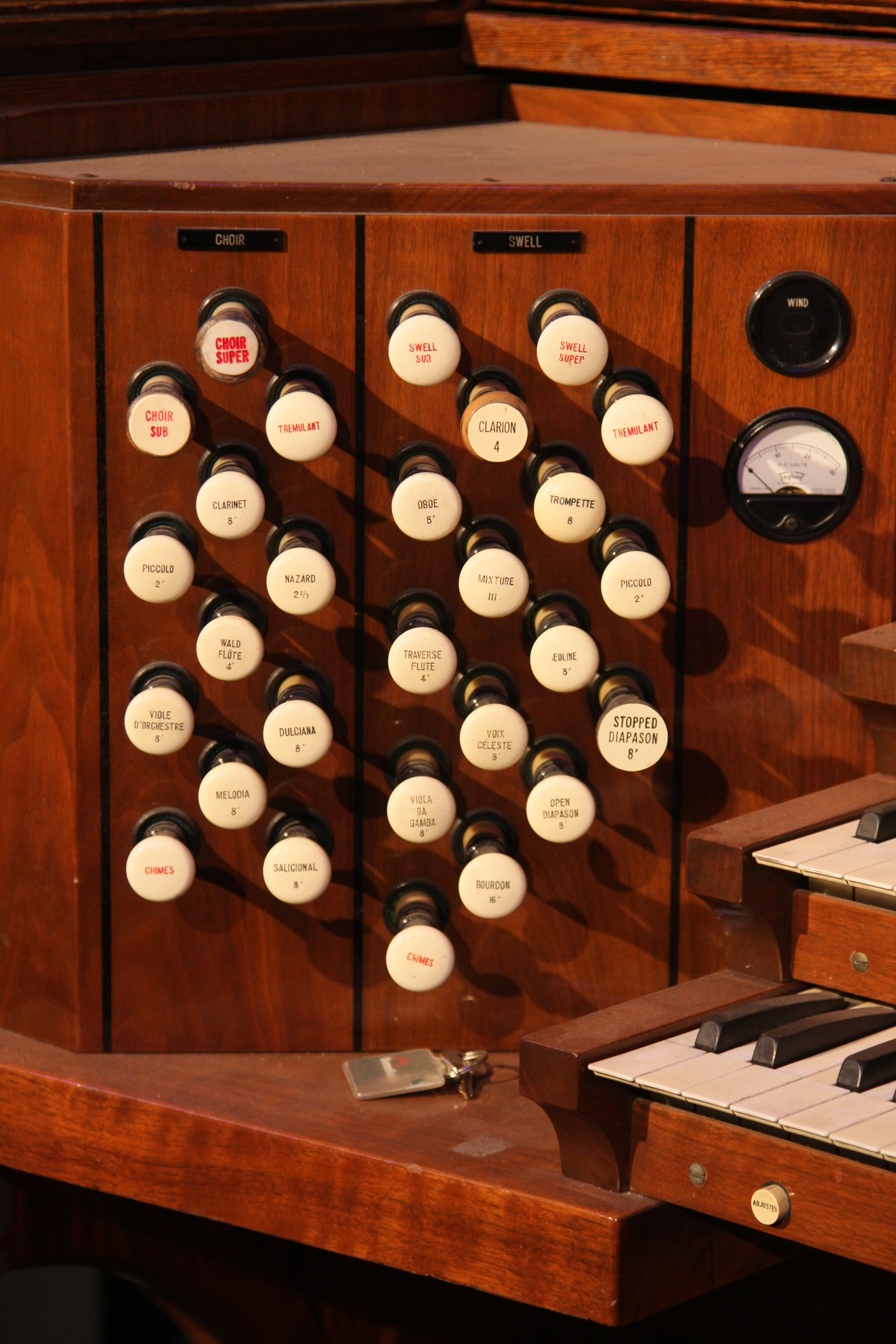
The Choir and Swell Stops to the left of the manuals

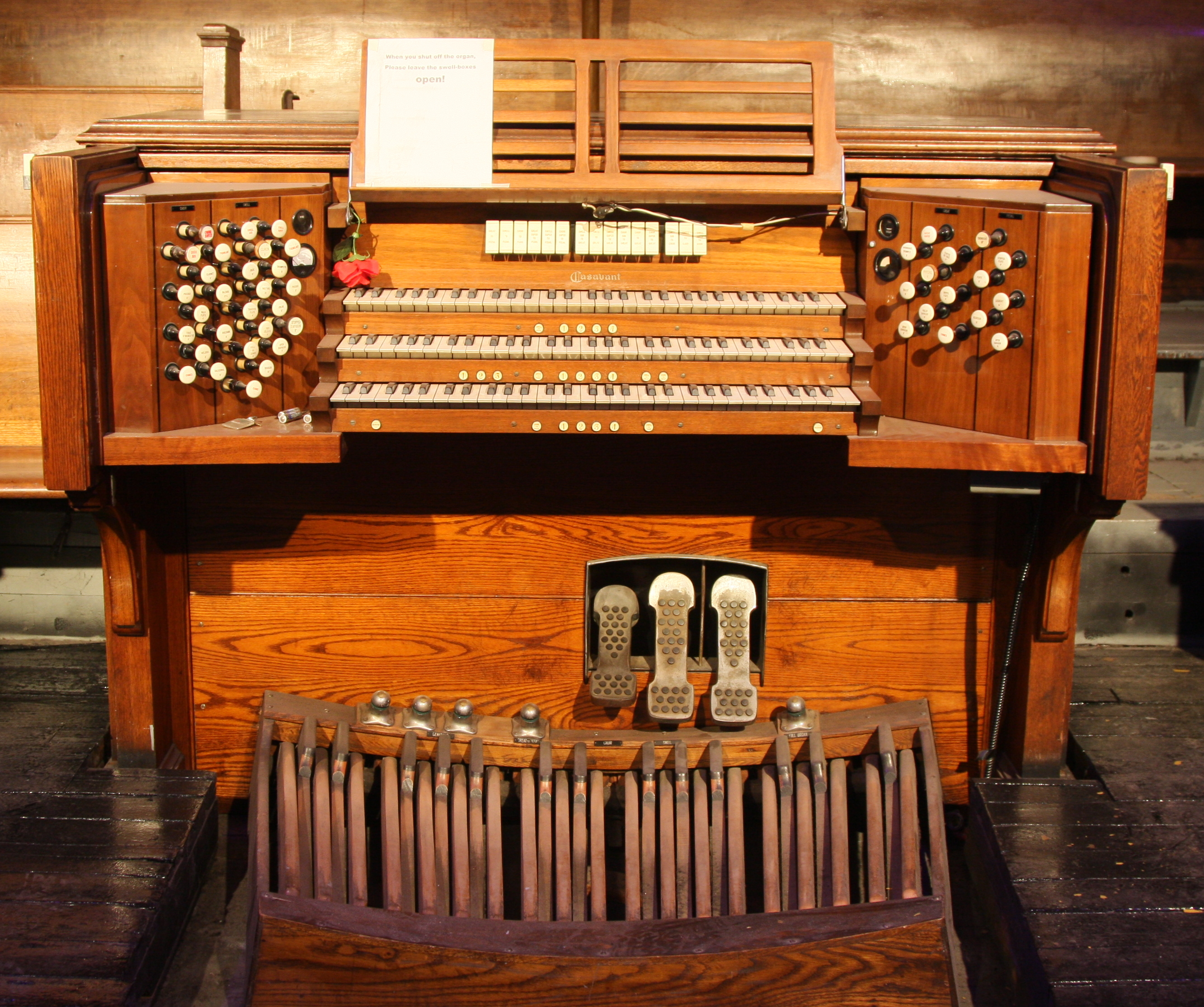
The Console, showing the stops, the three manuals, and the pedals

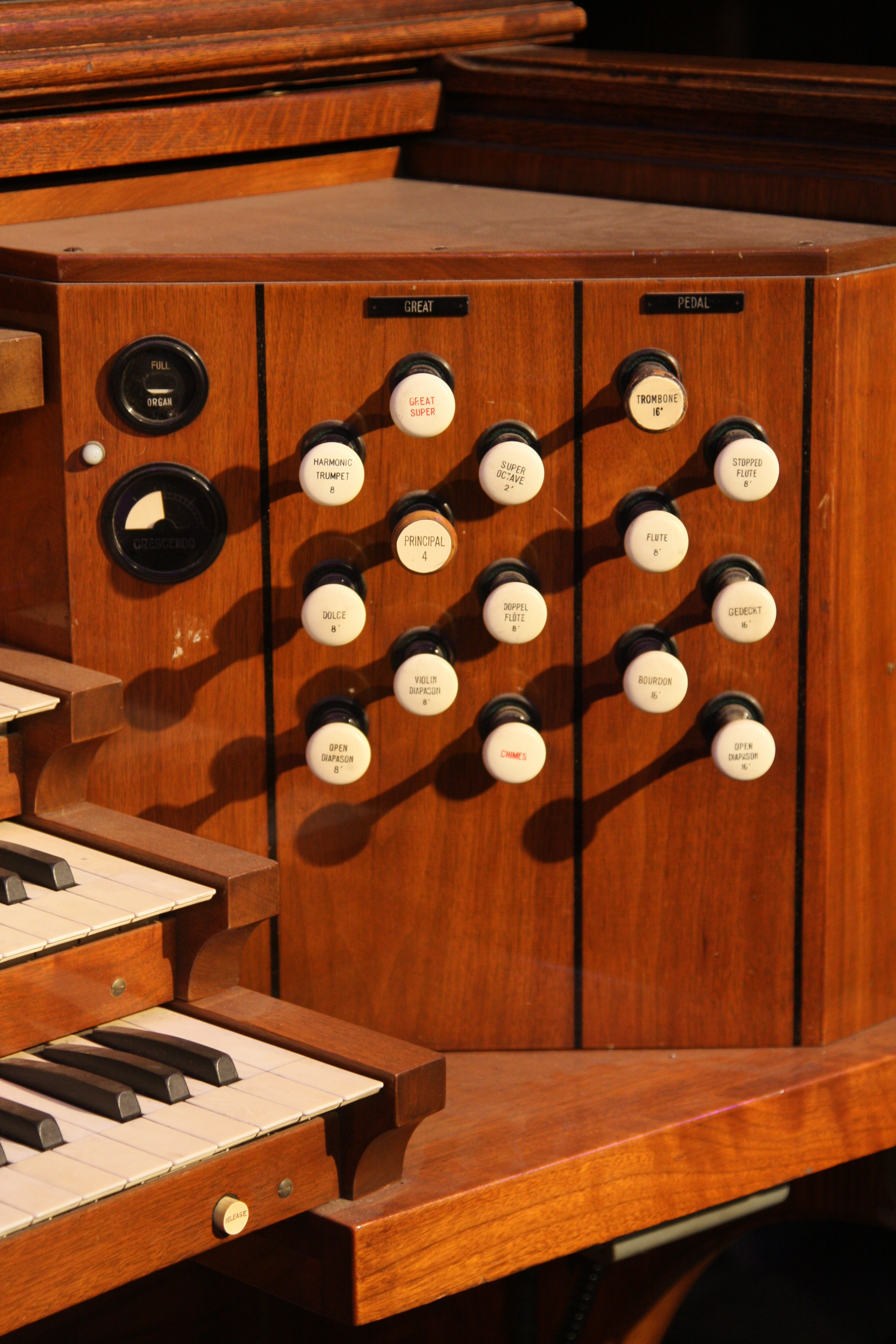
The Great and Pedal Stops to the right of the manuals

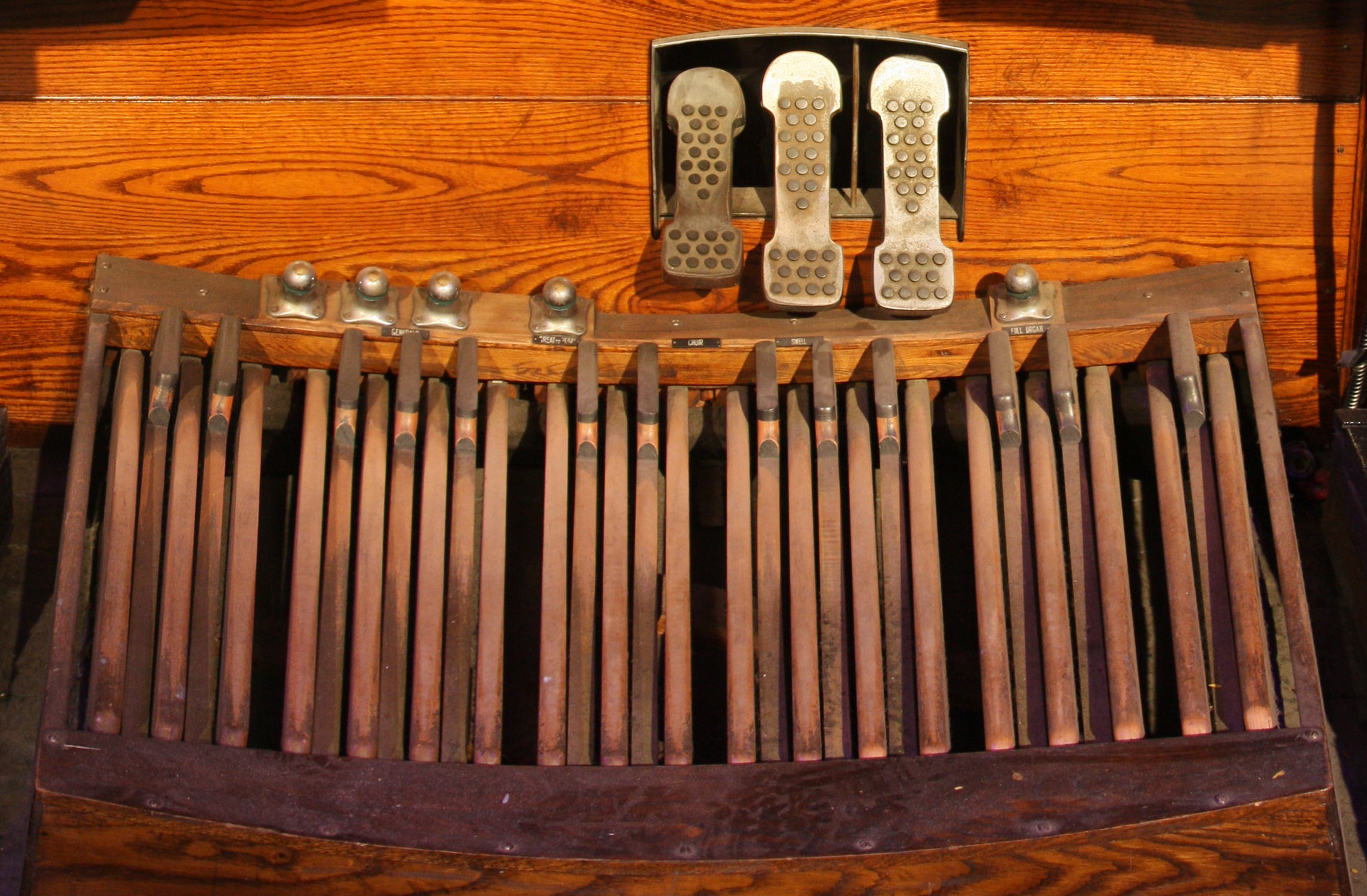
The Pedalboard, Choir, Swell, and Crescendo Pedals and Toe Studs

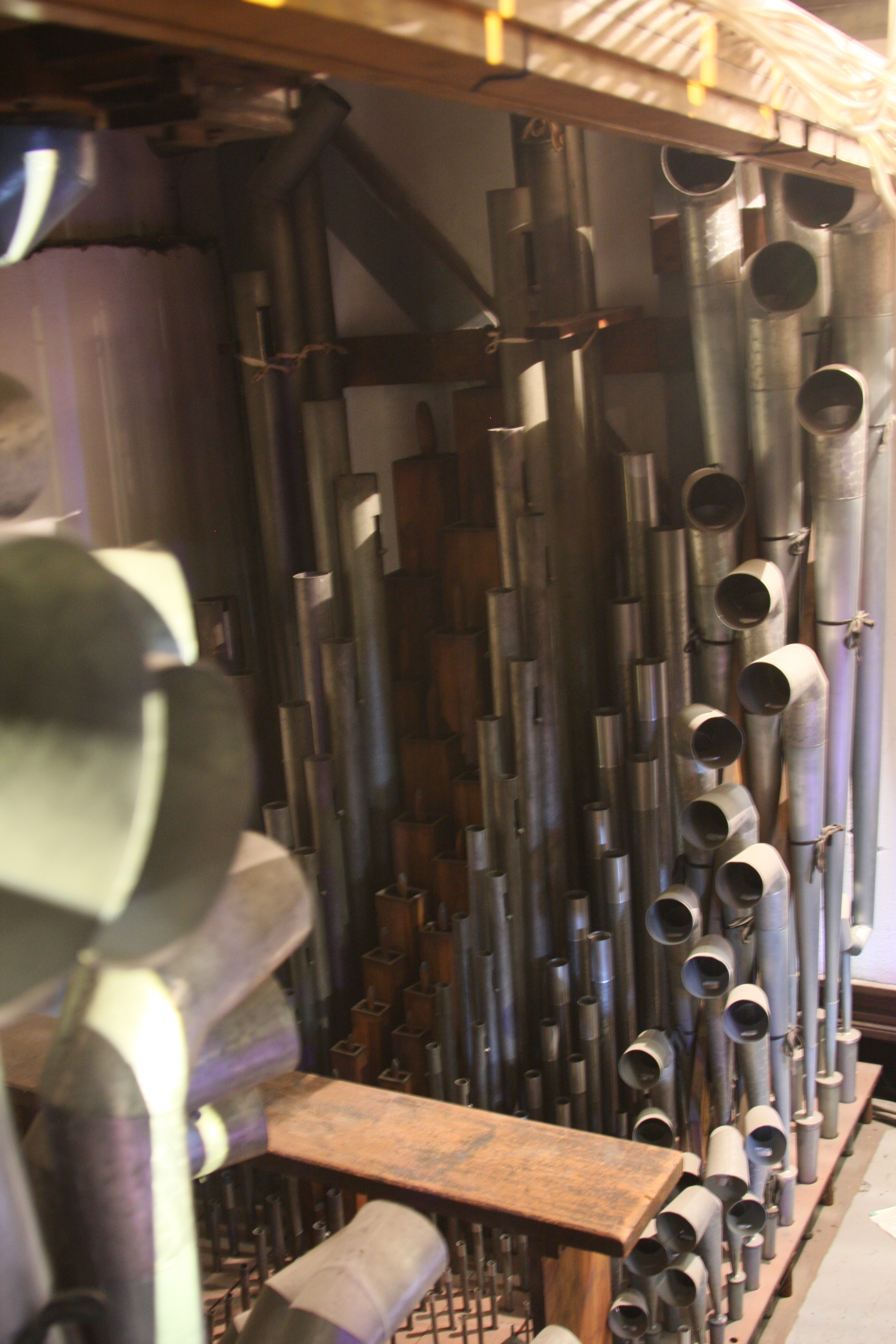
Pipes of the Great Organ. The square stopped wooden pipes are part of the Doppelflöte 8', a wooden stop with two mouths per pipe. The metal pipes with a right angle bend are part of the Harmonic Trumpet 8' stop.

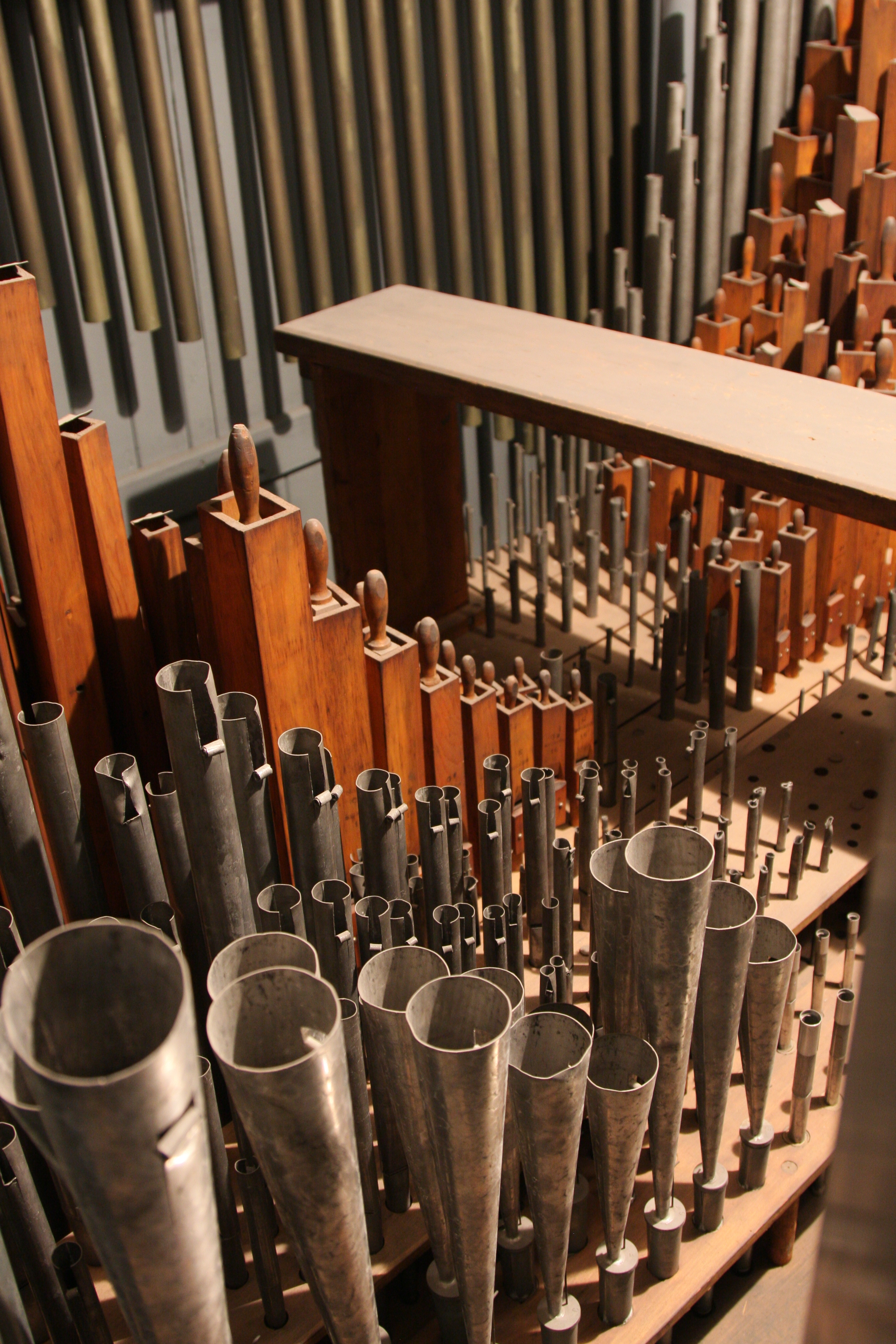
Pipes and Chimes of the Swell Organ. The ranks of metal and wooden pipes inside the upper swell box inside the organ.

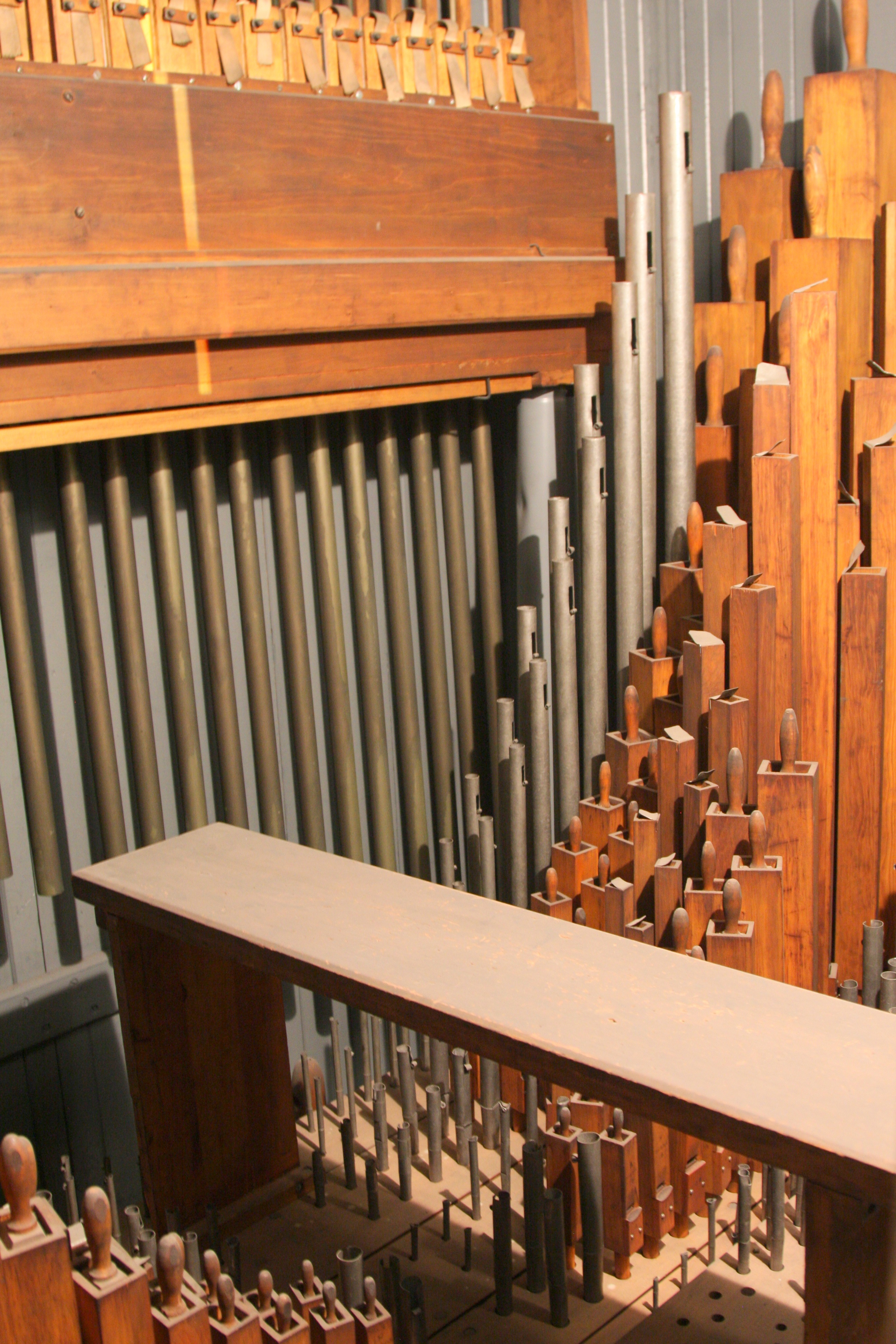
Pipes and Chimes of the Swell Organ. The tubular chimes and several of the ranks of wooden and metal pipes inside the upper swell box inside the organ. The small pipes of the 3 rank Mixture III fill much of the centre of the image.

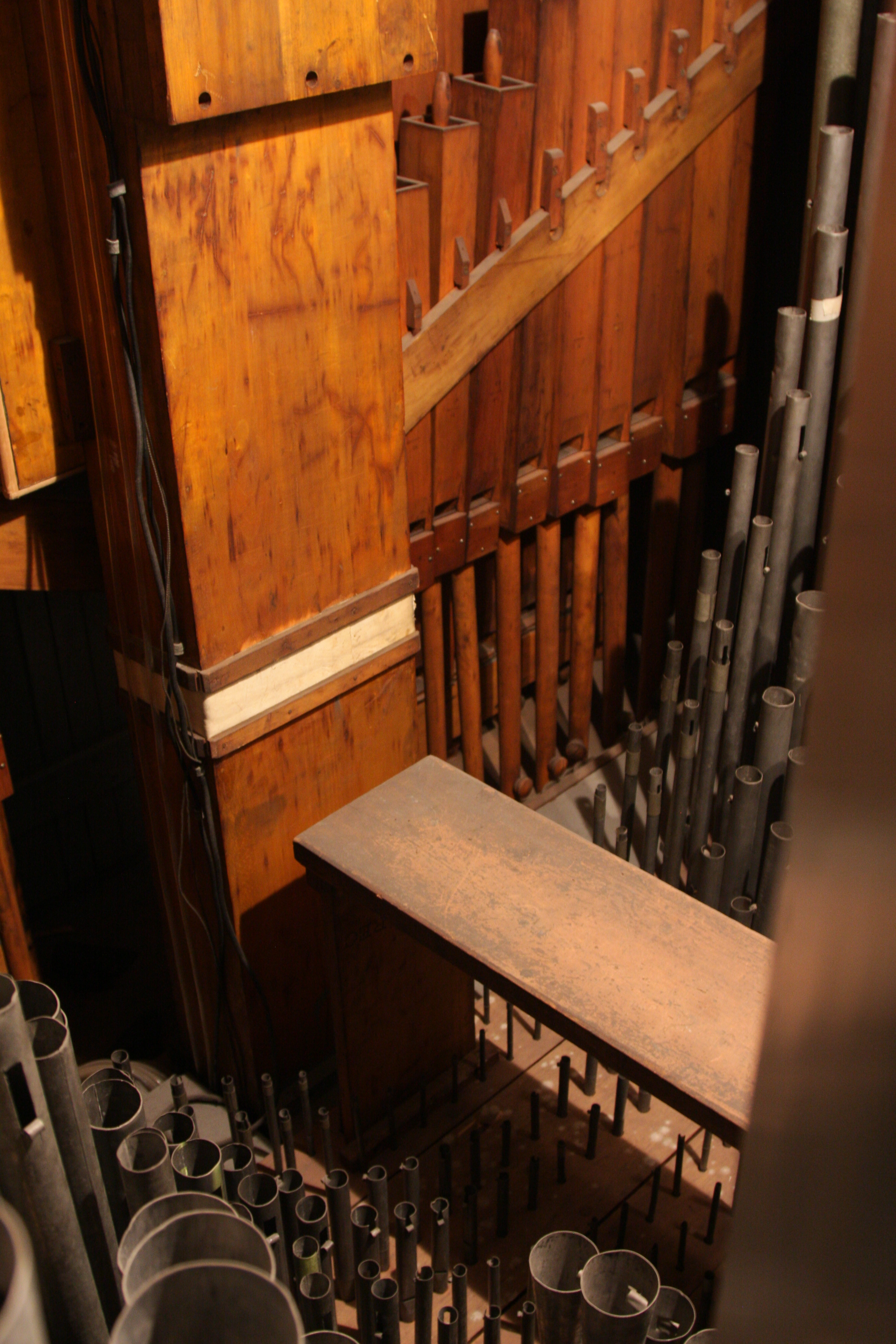
Pipes of the Swell Organ. The ranks of metal and wooden pipes inside the lower swell box inside the organ.

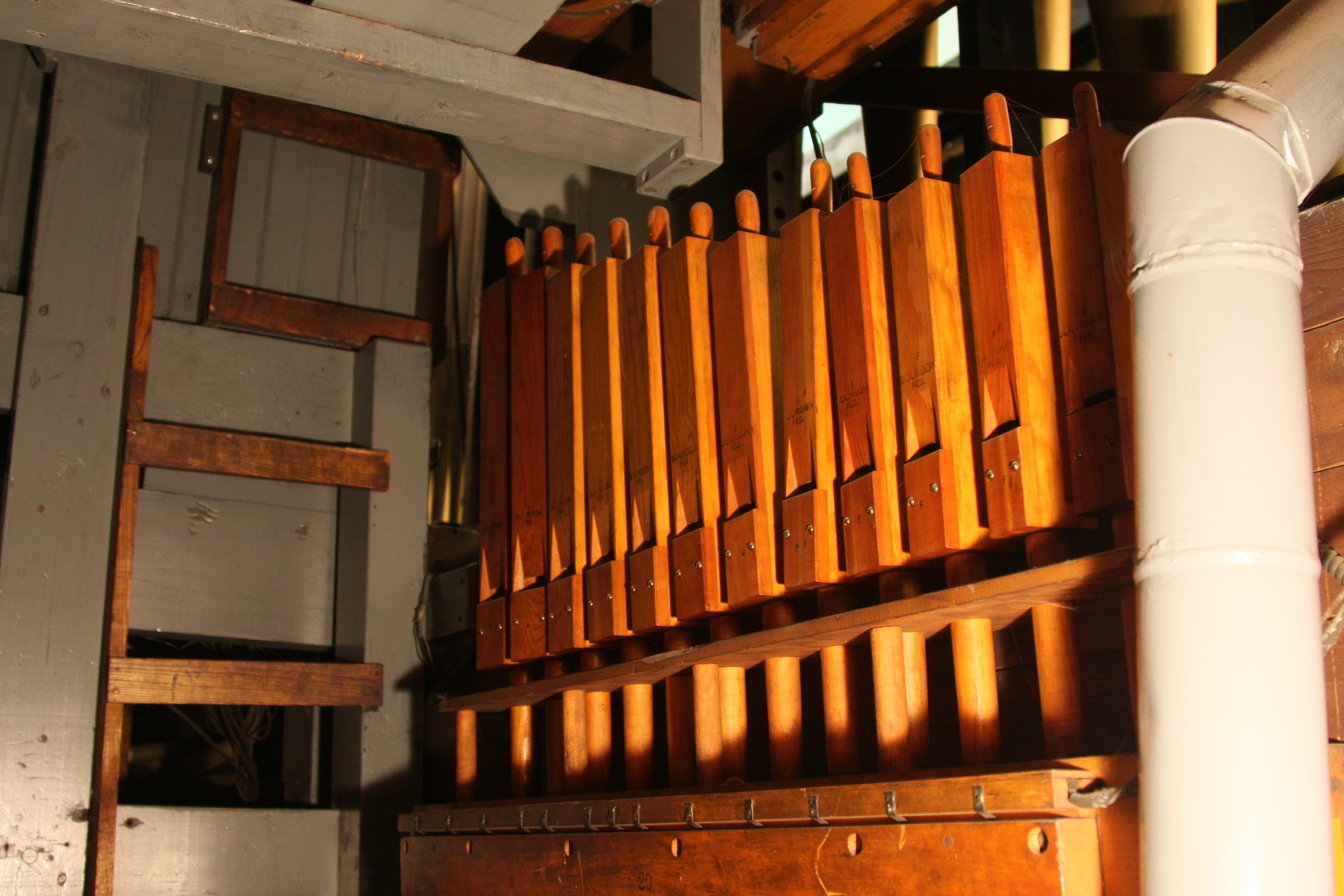
Pipes of the Pedal Organ. These 12 wooden pipes are the extension to the pedal Bourdon 16’ that created the Stopped Flute 8’.

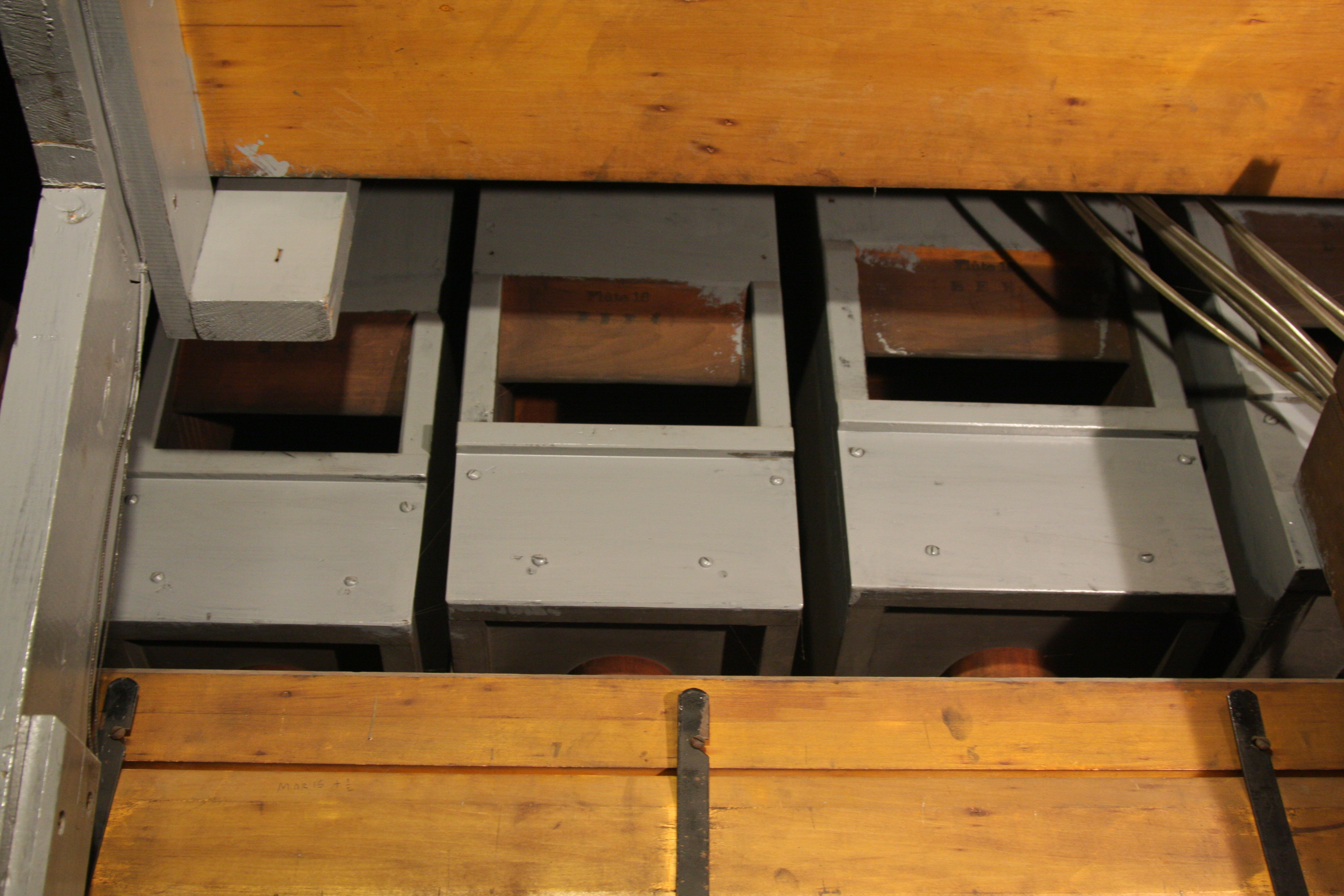
Pipes of the Pedal Organ. The foot, cap, block and mouth of several of the large pipes of the Open Diapason 16'. The middle pipe shown sounds FFF♯ (23.125 Hz). These are the organ's largest wooden pipes with nine pipes grouped together on their own wind chest, each pipe with double air valves to accommodate the large amount of air they require to sound.

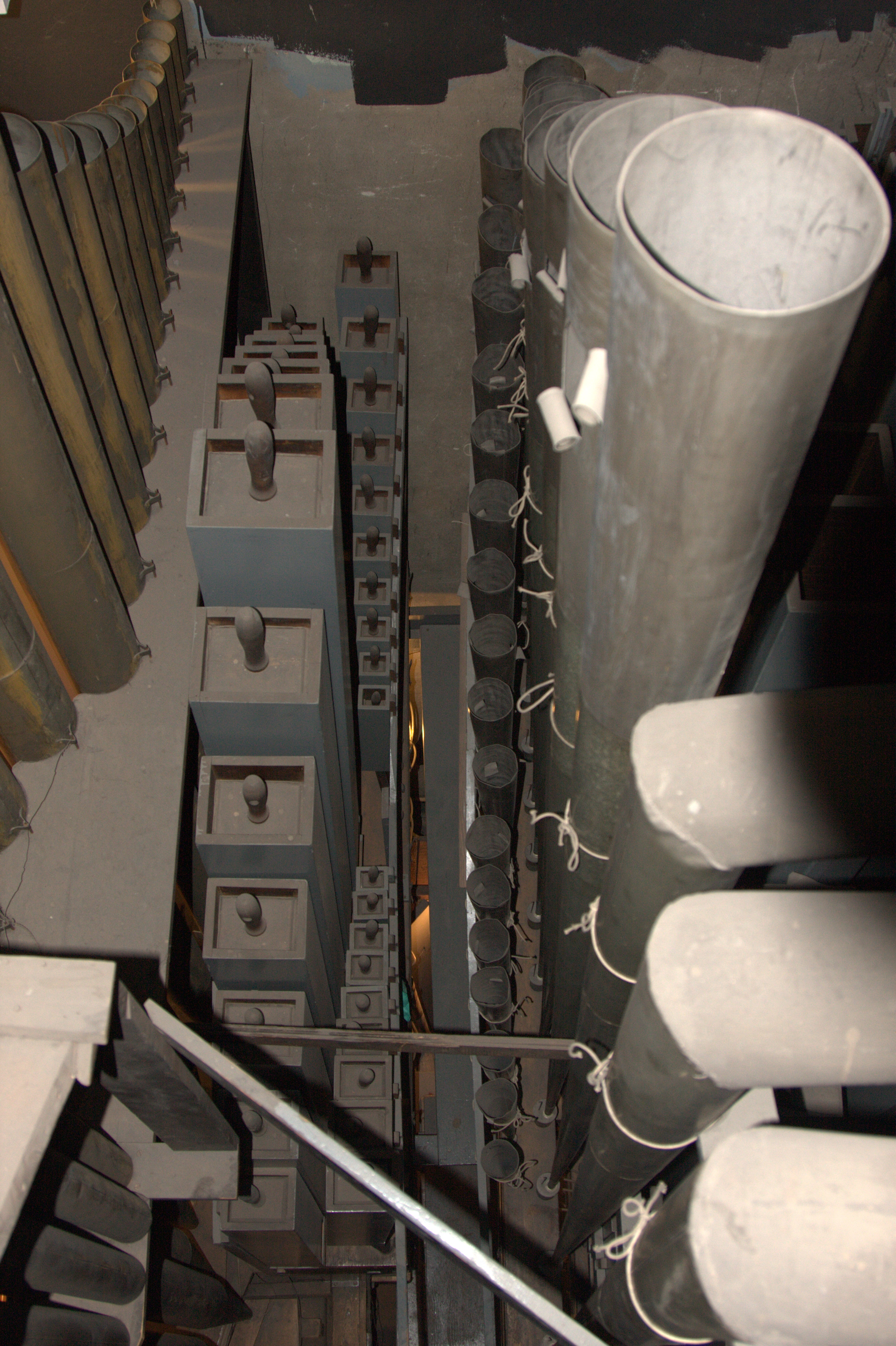
Pipes of the Pedal Organ. Looking down from above at the ranks of square wooden pipes of the Bourdon 16' and round tapered metal pipes of the Trombone 16'

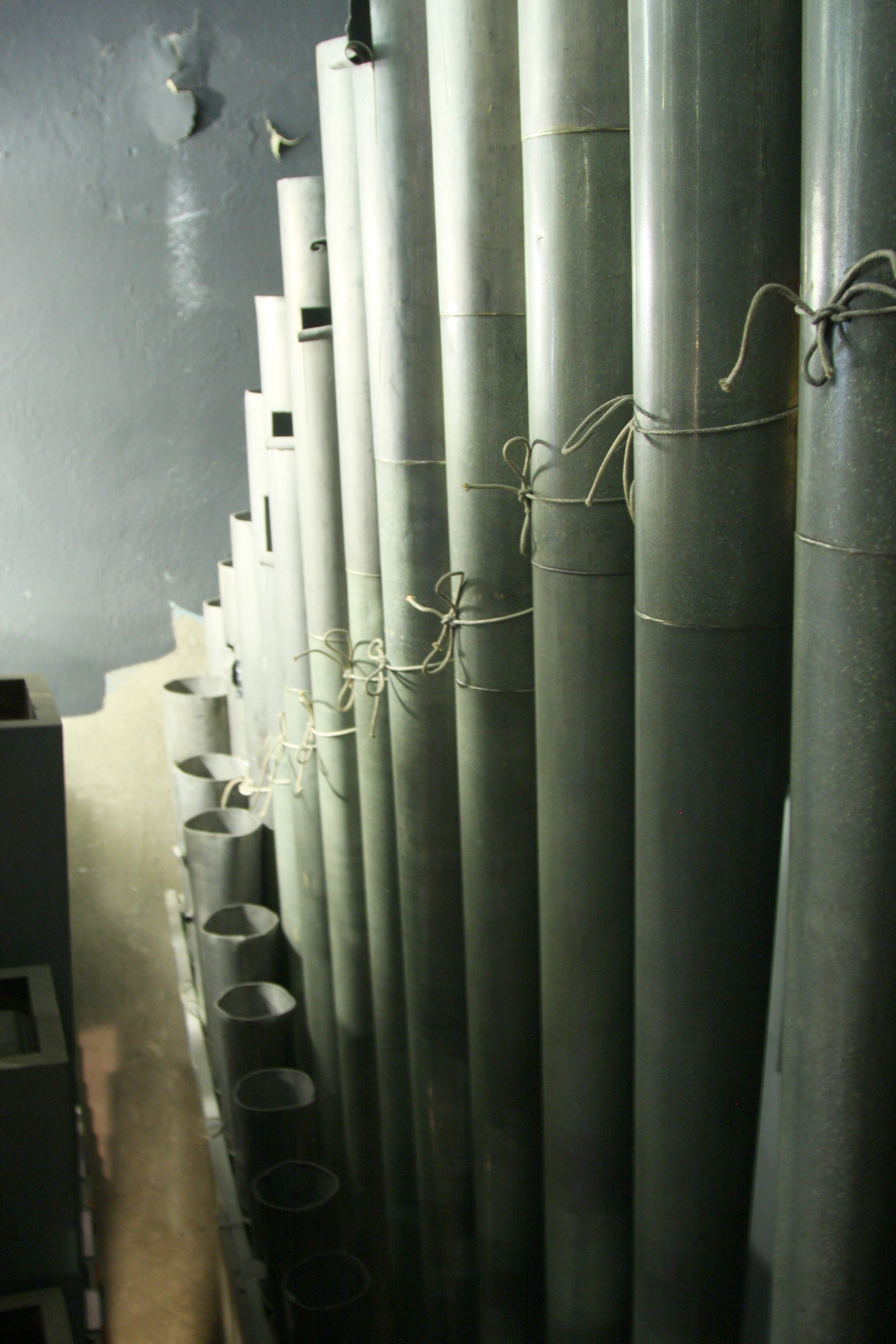
One of the ranks of round tapered metal pipes inside the organ.

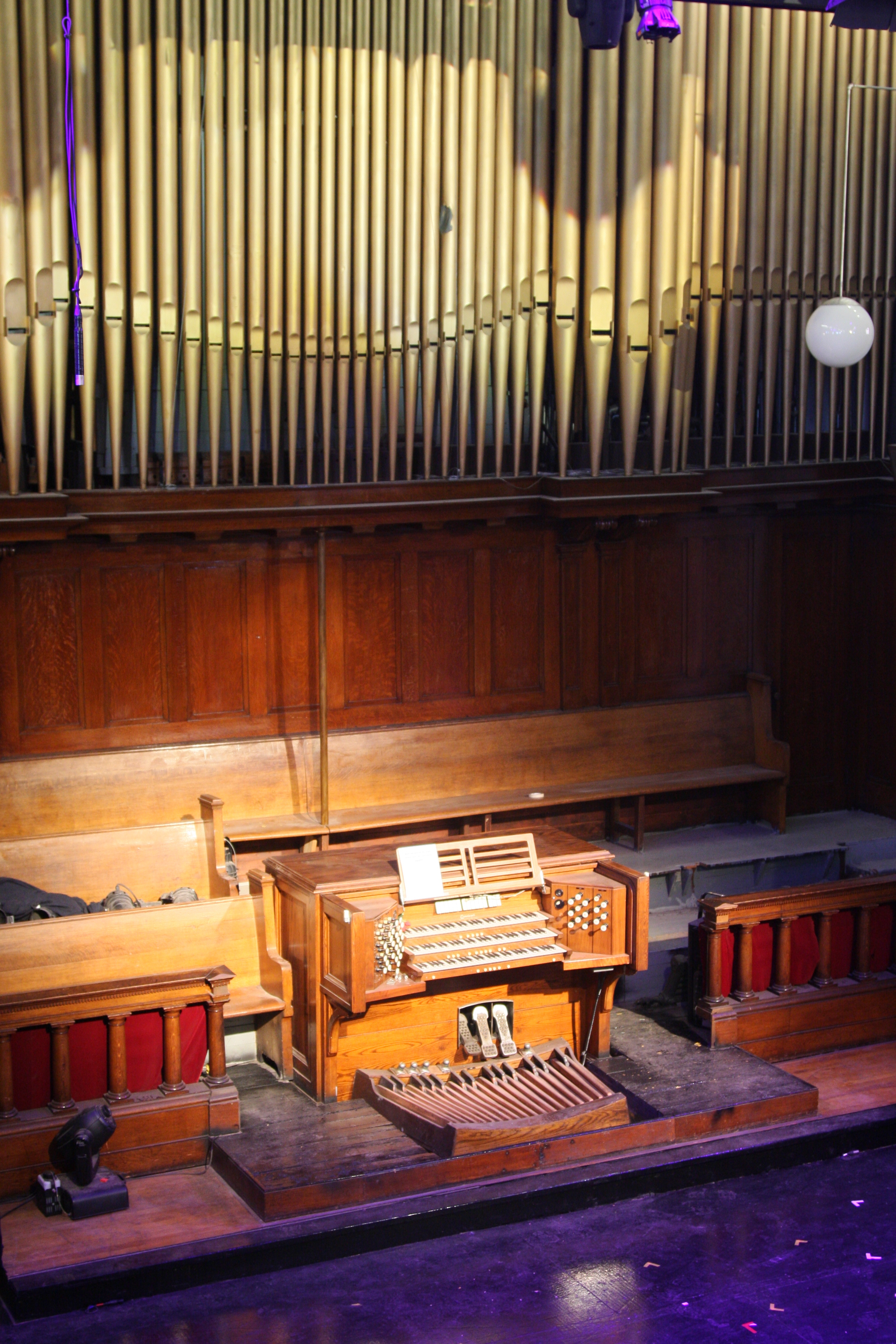
The 2,045 pipe, three-manual pipe organ made by the famous Casavant Frères in Quebec.

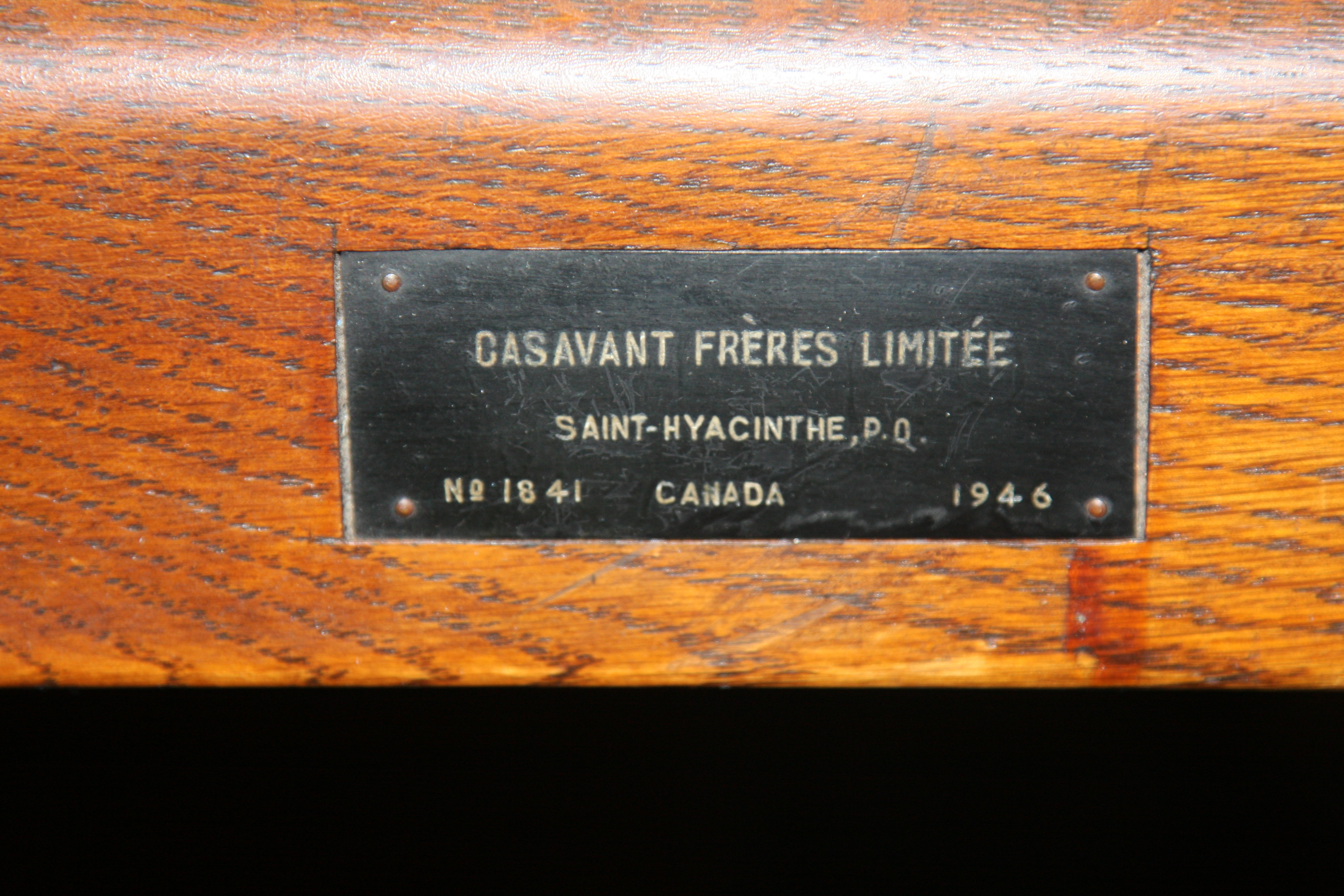
Nameplate of Casavant Frères Ltée. Opus 1841 (Highland Arts Centre Organ) rebuilt in 1946 from 1911 - Opus 452.
