= Reedpipe =

Reedpipe may refer to:

- Reed pipe, type of organ pipe
- Reed aerophone, wind instrument using a reed
