= Bourdon (organ pipe) =

Type of pipe in an organ

Bourdon, bordun, or bordone normally denotes a stopped flute type of flue pipe in an organ characterized by a dark tone, strong in fundamental, with a quint transient but relatively little overtone development. Its half-length construction makes it especially well suited to low pitches, and economical as well. The name is derived from the French word for 'bumblebee' or 'buzz'.

== Description ==
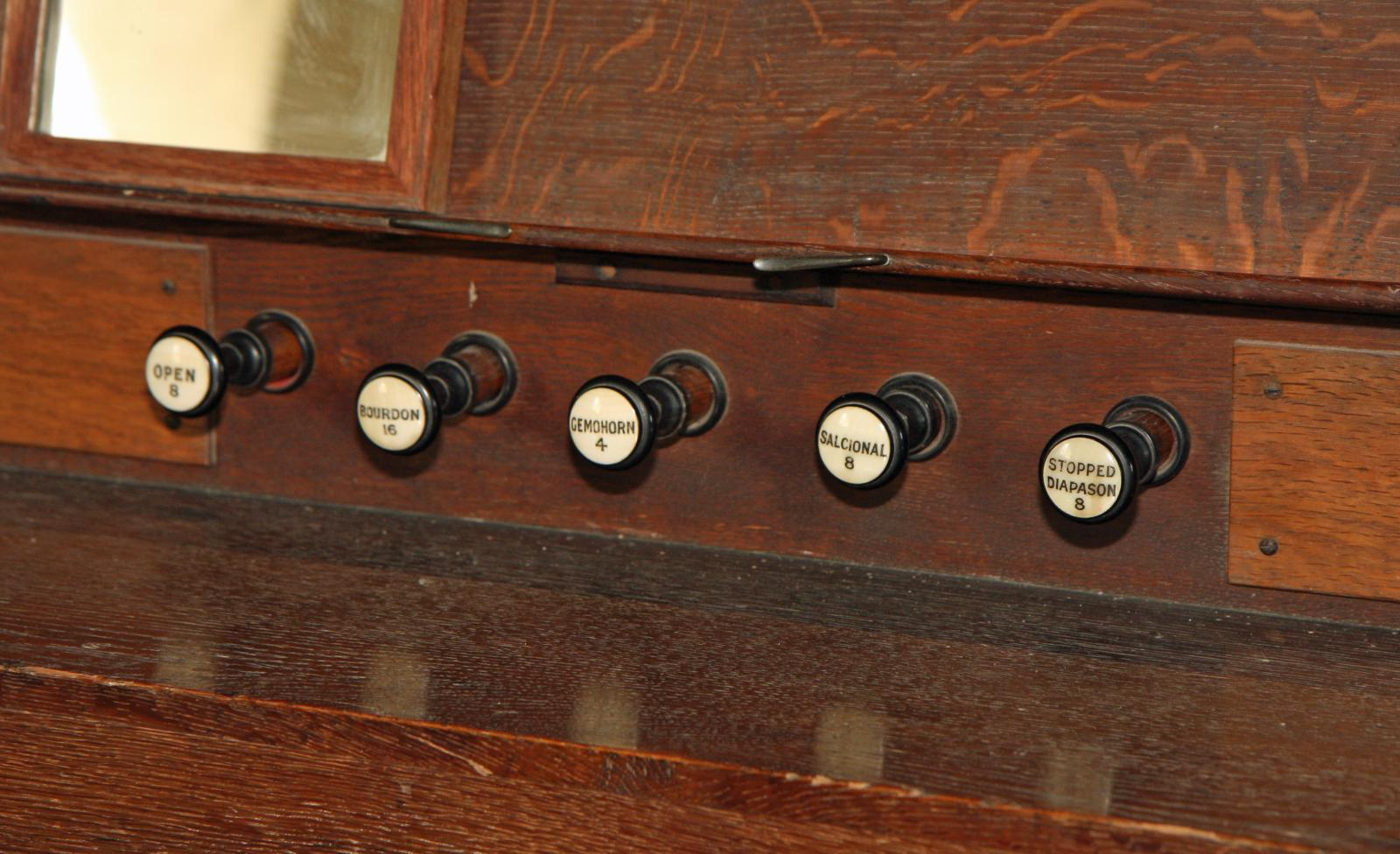
Stops on an organ by an unknown builder

This stop is most commonly found in the manuals and the pedal at 16' pitch. In lower registers, it provides the foundation but does not provide much pitch definition. It is also found in the pedal division at 32' pitch, where its roll of sound can actually shake the building it is installed in. When installed in the pedal division, it is often known as Subbass or Soubasse (Fr.).

The Bourdon is also frequently found at 8', especially in French organs, and is equivalent to the German Gedackt and English Stopped Diapason, which give a similar sound. Although varying between builders, the Bourdon stop is usually fairly soft and neutral, but colorful in the tenor register.

The pipes can be built of wood or metal, but are overwhelmingly constructed of wood in modern organ building (French makers from Cavaillé-Coll on prefer metal). They are thick-walled and generally square in cross-section, with a high mouth cut-up to produce the fluty tone. Bourdon is a stopped pipe, having an airtight stopper fitted into the top. This makes the tone one octave lower than a pipe of open construction (they are only one half the length of an open pipe of the same pitch), and also eliminates the development of even-numbered harmonics ("squaring off" the timbre), helping to create the characteristic tone quality.

This stop is very common in church organs and indeed theatre organs. In an organ so small as to have only one 16' stop in the pedal division, it will almost invariably be a bourdon, as the unassertive tone works well under soft or loud combinations, and blends well with all sounds of the organ.

== Spelling ==
'Bourdon' has many spellings and German organ builders will often use "Bordun", or even "Untersatz" (typically when it is in the pedals) on the stop knob for this rank. "Subbass" was originally a stop of a somewhat different design than the Bourdon, but the word is accepted today as a synonym for a Bourdon in the pedals. The Italian spelling is "Bordone".

== Sources ==
- Stauff, Edward (16 January 2017). "Bourdon". Encyclopedia of Organ Stops. Archived from the original on 16 January 2017.
