= Pipe organ tuning =

Process of tuning a pipe organ

This article describes the process and techniques involved in the tuning of a pipe organ. Electronic organs typically do not require tuning.

A pipe organ produces sound via hundreds or thousands of organ pipes, each of which produces a single pitch and timbre. The goal of tuning a pipe organ is to adjust the pitch of each pipe so that they all sound in tune with each other.

== Pitch ==
For many years, there was no pitch standard across Europe. The frequency of a′ (the standard note for tuning musical instruments), for example, could range from a′=392 Hz in parts of France to a′=465 Hz (Cornet-ton pitch) in parts of Germany. Organs were often tuned differently than ensembles, even within the same region or town. The modern tuning standard of a′=440 Hz (c′=262 Hz) was proposed in 1939, and accepted by the International Organization for Standardization (as ISO 16) in 1955 and again in 1975.

== Process ==
The first task of an organ tuner is to select a temperament. Generally speaking, the temperament of a pipe organ is part of its design, and is not lightly changed during its lifetime. Equal temperament is very common, but by no means universal. Along with the temperament goes the overall concert pitch of the instrument, often A=440 Hz in modern instruments, but this also is far from universal. The pitch of an organ cannot be significantly changed without major work, as pipes need to be shortened or lengthened.

Another important preparation step is to stabilize the temperature of the building in which the organ resides. Ideally, the temperature should be the same as that at which the organ will be typically used, and the temperature should have been stable for many hours before beginning the tuning. The reason for this is that the pitch of organ pipes varies significantly with temperature, and not all pipes vary at the same rate relative to temperature.

The actual tuning process begins with the tuning of the "tuning stop", the stop to which most or all other stops will be tuned in turn. The tuning stop is usually the 4 ft Octave or Principal (Diapason) in each division. The middle octave is usually tuned first, either by ear, or using some sort of electronic tuning device. The rest of the tuning stop is tuned to itself, in octaves. That is, tenor C is tuned to middle C, tenor D to middle D, and so forth.

Once the tuning stop is fully in tune with itself, the rest of the stops are tuned. Most stops are tuned to the tuning stop, though some stops are more easily tuned to stops other than a 4 ft Principal.

== Tools and techniques ==
The most common tuning tool is called a "tuning knife". It is a piece of metal used to tap gently on the tuning mechanism of a pipe, so as to avoid touching the pipe with the hands.

The techniques for tuning flue pipes vary with the construction of the pipe:

- An open metal pipe usually has a sliding collar ("tuning slide") at the top of the pipe that can be moved to change the pitch.
- An open wooden pipe may have a metal flap partially covering its top, which can be rolled or unrolled, or bent upward or downward.
- On a slotted metal pipe, some or all of the metal cut out to make the slot is rolled up so the slot can effectively be shortened or lengthened, thus changing the pitch of the pipe.
- On a slotted wooden pipe, a wooden slider is provided to shorten or lengthen the slot.
- A stopped pipe (wood or metal) is usually tuned by moving its stopper up or down.
- A capped pipe is usually tuned by moving its cap up or down.
- A conical metal pipe will sometimes have a tuning slide, but often is tuned by moving the large ears on either side of the pipe's mouth.
- Small metal pipes are often "cone tuned", whereby the top of each pipe is deformed inward or outward using a heavy hollow cone. Such tuning is extremely stable, but causes gradual damage to the pipe over time.

Reed pipes may be tuned in any of several ways: (1) by lengthening or shortening the vibrating length of the reed tongue by means of a wire protruding from the boot of the pipe; (2) by adjusting the effective speaking length of the resonator; (3) by adjusting the metal flap in the side of the resonator or the cap on the top of the pipe (especially with fractional length pipes). All of these methods can also affect the tonal regulation of the pipe, so tuning reed pipes is trickier than tuning flue pipes.

== Miscellaneous ==
Organ pipes are so sensitive to temperature that the body heat of the organ tuner can affect the tuning. If one holds a small metal flue pipe briefly in one's hand and then returns it to the chest (windchest), its pitch (relative to a tuning reference) can be heard to change as the pipe returns to room temperature.

If two pipes of the same pitch stand close to each other on the chest, they can draw each other into tune, even though their pitches are slightly off when played individually.

The pitch of very low-pitched pipes (in the 16 ft and 32 ft octaves) can be inaudible close to the pipe.

Organ tuners often listen for beats between harmonics rather than the fundamentals. The audibility of these harmonics is extremely sensitive to the position of one's ears relative to the pipes. Eliminating the beats brings the pipe into tune.

Humidity is a factor in maintaining wooden pipes. Many churches use humidifiers/dehumidifiers in an attempt to keep the organ loft from drying or becoming too moist. These devices must be carefully monitored and managed to avoid creating the opposite problem.

In fact, controlling the climate around a pipe organ can have a significant impact on its tuning and maintenance schedule. For example, while many pipe organs require tuning or other maintenance more than once a year, the Marcussen pipe organ on the campus of Wichita State University in Kansas is carefully kept at 72 degrees Fahrenheit and 50% humidity year round and requires tuning and maintenance only once every four years. Its Danish caretakers credit meticulous climate control.
