= Casavant Frères =

Canadian pipe organ company

- Type: Private
- Industry: Organ building
- Founded: 1879 in Saint-Hyacinthe, Quebec
- Founders: Joseph-Claver and Samuel-Marie Casavant
- Headquarters: Saint-Hyacinthe, Quebec, Canada
- Areas served: Worldwide
- Products: Pipe organs
- Website: www.casavant.ca

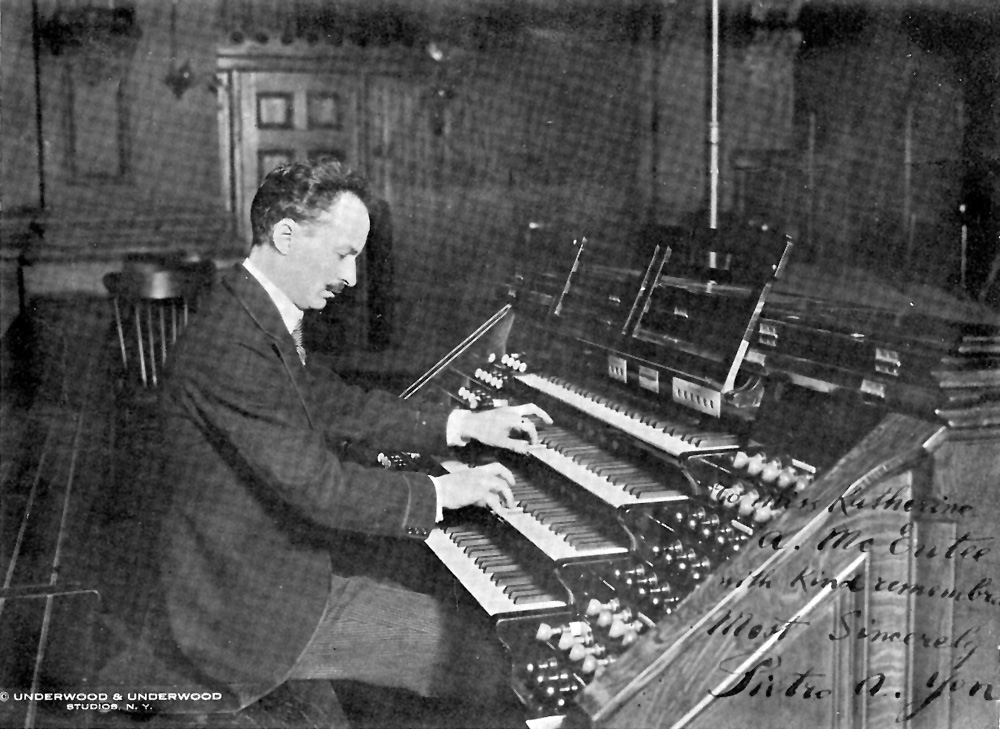
Pietro Yon at the console of a Casavant Frères organ, 1919

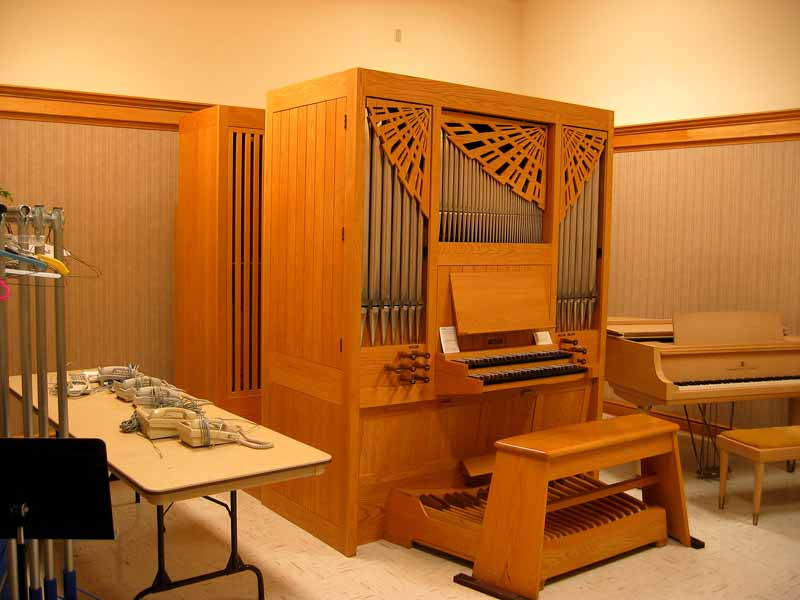
Casavant Frères practice organ in the Salt Lake Assembly Hall

Casavant Frères (French pronunciation: [kazavɑ̃ fʁɛʁ]) is a Quebecoise organ building company in Saint-Hyacinthe, Quebec, which has been building pipe organs since 1879. As of 2014, the company has produced more than 3,900 organs.

== Company history ==
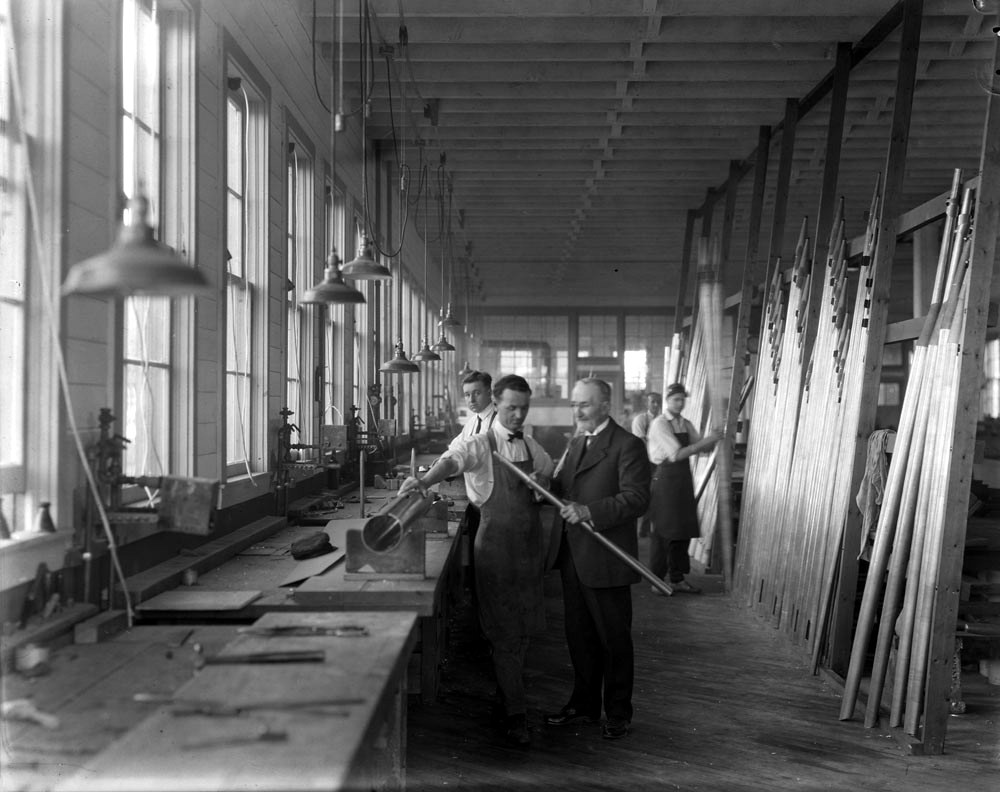
Interior of the pipe shop, 1930

Brothers Joseph-Claver (1855–1933) and Samuel-Marie (1859–1929) got their start in organ building in the shop of their father, Joseph Casavant, under his successor Eusèbe Brodeur. Claver worked with Brodeur during 1874–1878, then went to France for a 14-month apprenticeship with the firm of John Abbey in Versailles. He and Samuel then visited many organs and workshops in western Europe before establishing their factory in 1879 on the site of their father's workshop on rue Girouard in Saint-Hyacinthe.

== Technical innovations ==
Casavant's instruments boasted many innovations unique for that time, such as concave pedalboards, balanced expression pedals, keyboard improvements, and other enhancements. Their reputation as organ builders of international status was cemented in 1891 with their construction of the organ for the Notre-Dame de Montréal Basilica, a four-manual organ of eighty-two stops. This organ features adjustable combinations and speaking pipes of thirty-two foot length in the façade.

They won the Grand Prix at the International Exhibition held in Antwerp, Belgium, in 1930. They built organs around the world, including Canada, the United States, France, the West Indies, South and Central America, South Africa, and Japan. Their organs have been praised by many well-known organists over the last 100 years, including Guilmant, Vierne, Widor, Bonnet, Lemare, Dethier, Courboin, Bingham, and many others who inaugurated and played Casavant organs. Casavant organs are also found in colleges, universities and conservatories throughout the United States and Canada.

After the death of the Casavant brothers, the company continued to add innovations to their instruments. These include a particularly reliable key contact and tracker touch mechanism, which is a feature of the Casavant playing action.

During the 1960s, Casavant developed new electronic technology to the capture system of combination actions. In 1960, the company returned to mechanical action technology (while continuing to build electropneumatic action instruments as well) and has since built over two hundred tracker action instruments ranging in size from a single manual portable Continuo of four stops to two, three, and four manual organs.

New technology, such as solid-state coupling and switching systems, multiplex, multi-memory combination actions and MIDI have been adopted. Other improvements, such as more effective expressive enclosures, continue to be made.

The sound and style of Casavant organs has varied throughout the company's history. The Casavant brothers themselves, Samuel and Claver Casavant, reflected mostly influences from contemporary France, but they traveled widely and visited many European instruments. They later brought in an Englishman, Stephen Stoot, under whose direction the tonal palette reflected additional influences from England. Later tonal directors, Lawrence Phelps and Gerhard Brunzema, contributed styles from the German "Organ Reform Movement". The most recent tonal directors, Jean-Louis Coignet and Jacquelin Rochette, are rooted in but not limited to the various French organ building traditions.

== Some significant Casavant organs ==
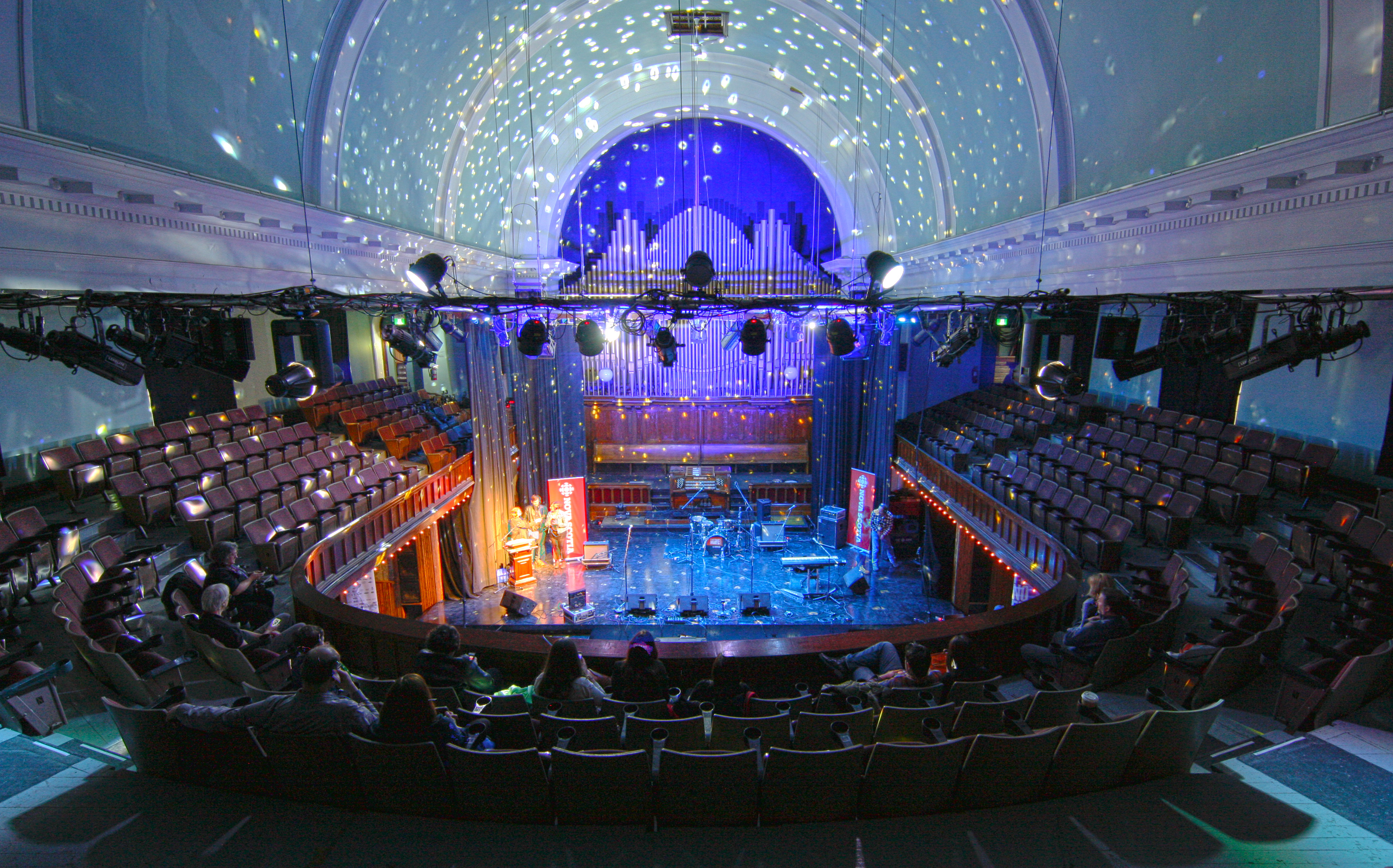
Opus 452, 1911 (orig), Opus 1841, 1946 (rebuilt), Highland Arts Theatre (formerly St. Andrew's Presbyterian Church), Sydney, Nova Scotia

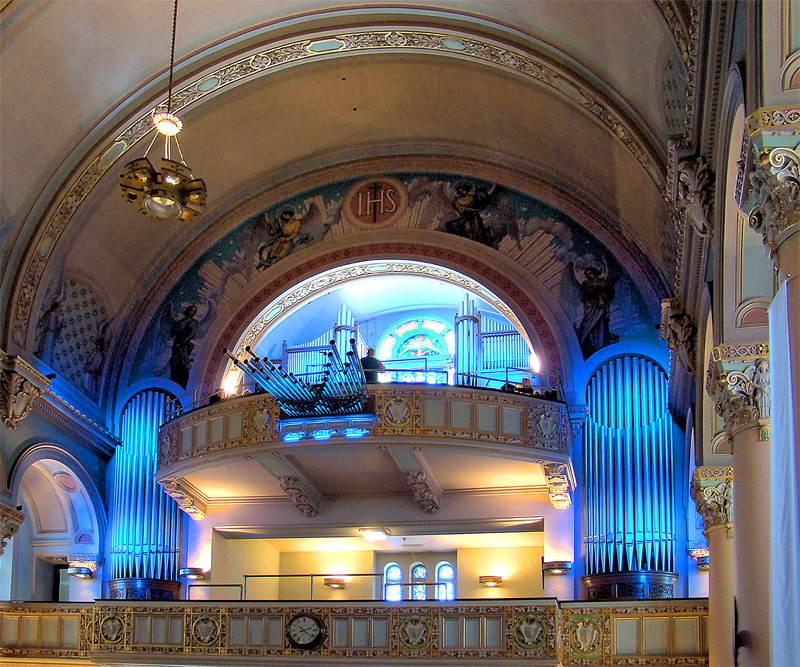
Saints-Anges Gardiens in Lachine, Montreal, Quebec

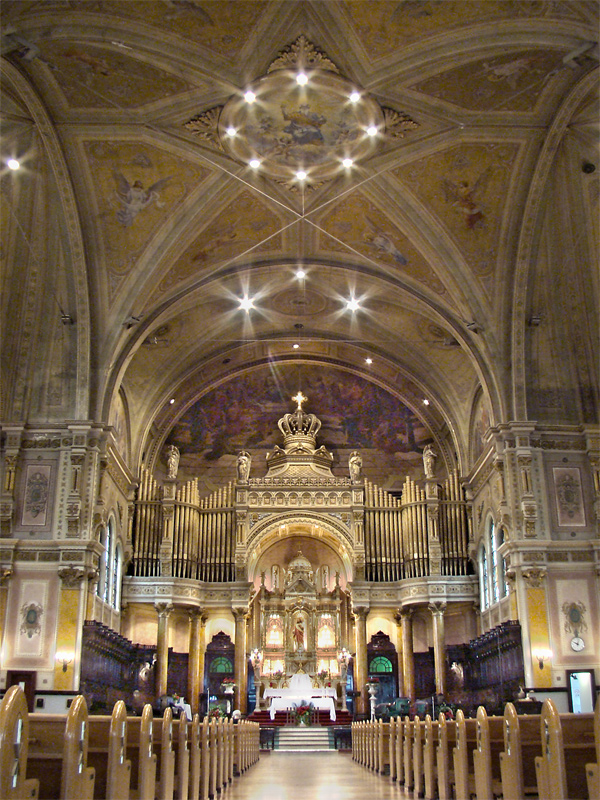
Saint-Nom-de-Jésus in Montreal

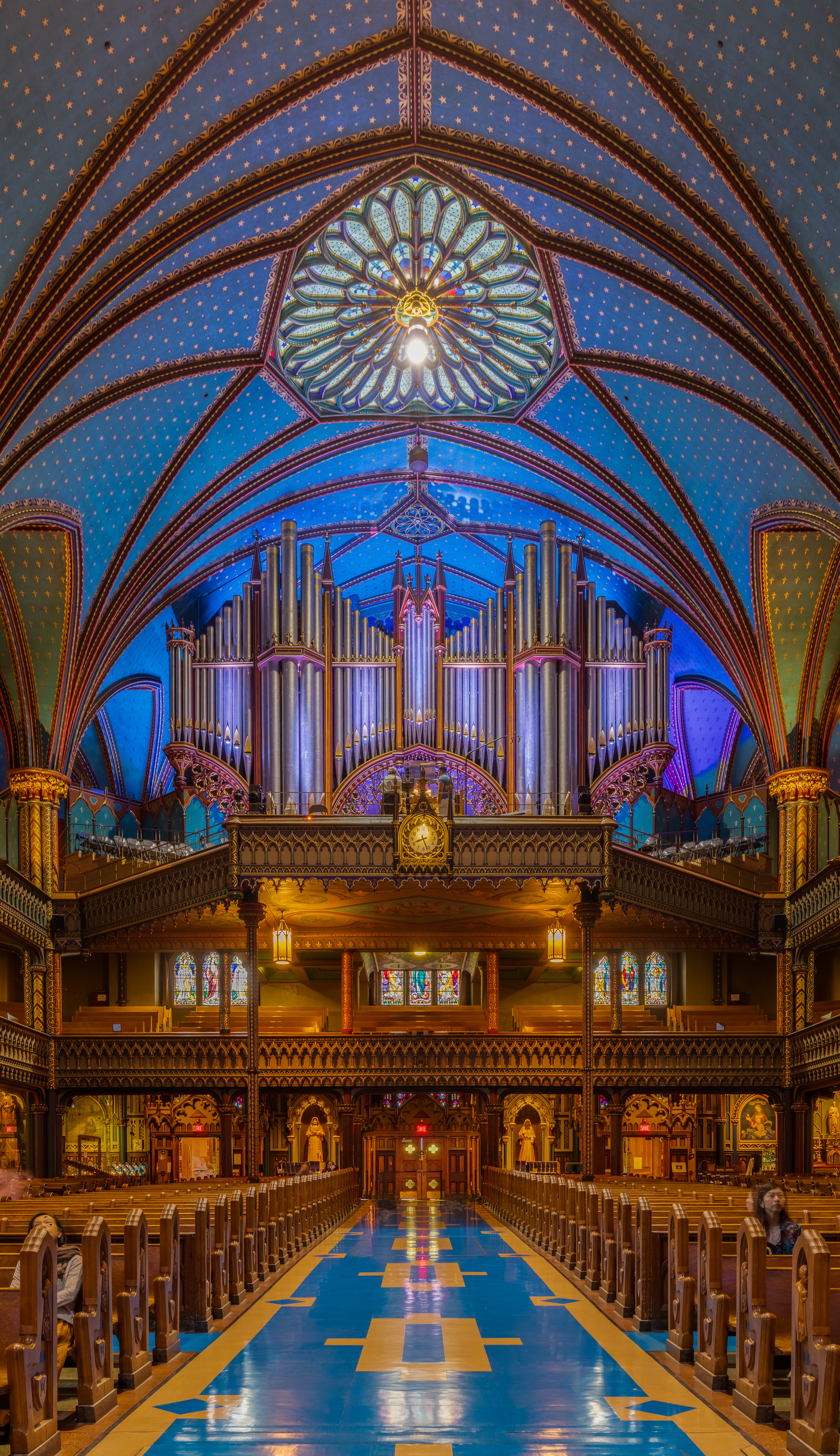
Notre-Dame Basilica in Montreal

- Opus 29, 1891 Église St-François-Xavier, à St-François-du-Lac
- Opus 34, 1892 (orig), Opus 715, 1917 (rebuilt), Opus 1647, 1940, Montreal, Quebec; Notre-Dame de Montréal Basilica, 83 stops
- Opus 78, 1897, Westfield Massachusetts; St. Mary's Church, the oldest Casavant still in use in the United States, orig. Notre Dame Church, Pittsfield, Massachusetts, removed 2005, installed in St. Mary's 2008
- Opus 90, 1898 (orig), St. Patrick's Church (Halifax, Nova Scotia), the oldest Casavant still in use in Canada, orig. It is the only three-manual instrument built with pneumatic action that is still in its original condition in Canada today, 35 stops
- Opus 281, 1907; St Marys, Ontario; United Church —upgraded many times over the years, including new pipe work and new console in 1979 and a solid state computer control system about 10 years ago. In 2011, thousands of additional voices and sounds were added by the installation of the Rodgers MX-200 MIDI sound expansion module, giving the organist access to several different 32' pedal stops, amongst other voices
- Opus 371, 1909; Opus 2071, 1951/2007, Edmonton, Alberta; First Presbyterian Church of Edmonton
- Opus 452, 1911 (orig), Opus 1841, 1946 (rebuilt), Sydney, Nova Scotia: Highland Arts Theatre, 33 stops, 30 registers, 32 ranks, 2045 pipes
- Opus 550, 1915, Toronto, Ontario; St Paul's Anglican Church, 106 stops
- Opus 553, 1915, Jacksonville, Florida; Jacksonville Symphony Orchestra 63 stops
- Opus 600, 1915, Montreal, Quebec; Saint-Nom-de-Jésus, 90 stops
- Opus 700, 1917, Boston, Massachusetts; Emmanuel Episcopal Church, 137 stops, relocated to an organ museum in Gulangyu Island, China in 2008
- Opus 715, 1917 - see Opus 34
- Opus 802, 1919, Ottawa, Ontario; Ottawa Korean Community Church
- Opus 851, 1920, Oshawa, Ontario; (formerly) Simcoe Street United Church (closed)
- Opus 1130, 1926, Chicago, Illinois; Saint James Methodist-Episcopal Church, relocated to St. John Cantius Church (Chicago) in 2011
- Opus 1200, 1927, Detroit, Michigan; Detroit Institute of Arts Auditorium
- Opus 1312, 1929, Toronto, Ontario; Royal York Hotel, 107 stops
- Opus 1367, 1930, Toronto, Ontario; Metropolitan United Church, 5 manuals, 109 stops
- Opus 1397, 1930, Enfield, New Hampshire; Mary Keane Chapel, Missionaries of Our Lady of La Salette, 3 manuals, 4 divisions, 28 stops, 26 registers, 29 ranks, 1862 pipes
- Opus 1424, 1932, Ottawa, Ontario; St. Joseph's Parish & Sanctuary, 3 manuals, 1892 speaking pipes, 24 stops
- Opus 1587/1588, 1938, Lewiston, Maine; Basilica of Saints Peter and Paul, 10 stops and 737 pipes, 53 stops and 4,622 pipes respectively
- Opus 1608, 1938, Montreal, Quebec; Saint James United Church, 64 stops, rebuild of Wadsworth 1888 and Warren 1909
- Opus 1647, 1940 - see Opus 75
- Opus 1659, 1940, Flushing, Long Island, New York; Saint Andrew Avellino Church (Roman Catholic) 43 stops
- Opus 1841, 1917 - see Opus 452
- Opus 1879, 1921, Halifax, Nova Scotia; St. Matthew's United Church, 59 stops, 61 ranks; new console 1957, revoiced and console digitized 1998
- Opus 1893/2560A, 1947/1959, Cambridge, Massachusetts; The Church of St. Paul (Harvard Square) (Roman Catholic), 50 stops, 1947 (since removed)
- Opus 1913, 1948, Winooski, Vermont; Saint Francis Xavier Catholic Church
- Opus, 1925, War Memorial Pipe Organ in University of Alberta, Edmonton, Alberta; Convocation Hall in memory of 80 University of Alberta comrades who gave up their lives during the Great War, cleaned and reconditioned in 1947
- Opus 2025, 1950, Weston, Ontario; Central United Church
- Opus 2133, 1953, Saint John, New Brunswick; St. Peter's Church
- Opus 2269/2270, 1954/1955, St. John's, Newfoundland; Basilica-Cathedral of St. John the Baptist, 66 stops, 4,050 pipes
- Opus 2570, 1960, Halifax, Nova Scotia; St. Mary's Basilica, 38 stops, 2,856 pipes
- Opus 2576, 1960, Denver, Colorado; First Church Christ, Scientist, 69 ranks, 51 stops
- Opus 2641, 1961, Pittsburgh, Pennsylvania; St. Bernard Roman Catholic Church, 4 manuals, 92 ranks, 150 stops
- Opus 2666, 1965, State College, Pennsylvania; Grace Lutheran Church, 33 ranks and 2048 pipes
- Opus 2670, 1963, Dayton, Ohio; Westminster Presbyterian Church, 122 ranks, 7442 pipes
- Opus 2722, 1963, Minneapolis, Minnesota; Central Lutheran Church, 78 stops, 107 ranks
- Opus 2730, 1963, Wolfville, Nova Scotia; Acadia University, Canada, Manning Memorial Chapel
- Opus 2793, 1964, Fall River, Massachusetts; St. Anne's Church, 3 manuals, 4 divisions, 58 stops, 57 registers, 84 ranks, 4518 pipes
- Opus 2798, 1964, Montreal, Quebec; St. Antonin Church, 5391 Av Snowdown, 3 manuals, 33 stops, 51 ranks
- Opus 2839, 1965, Southgate, Michigan; Christ the King Lutheran Church
- Opus 2889, 1966, Traverse City, Michigan; First Congregational Church
- Opus 2892, 1966, New York, New York; St. Ignatius of Antioch Episcopal Church, rebuilt 2011, 3 manuals, 32 stops, 44 ranks
- Opus 2927, 1967, Saratoga Springs, New York; Bethesda Episcopal Church
- Opus 2955, 1968, Fort Collins, Colorado; Colorado State University, Recital Hall, 2079 pipes, 34 stops
- Opus 3062, 1970, La Grange, Illinois; Emmanuel Episcopal Church
- Opus 3079, 1970, Portland, Oregon; Chapel of Lewis & Clark College, 66-stops, probably the only organ in the world which was built entirely suspended from the ceiling
- Opus 3101, 1971, Asheville, North Carolina; Cathedral of All Souls in Biltmore Village
- Opus 3105, 1971, Iowa City, Iowa; St. Andrew Presbyterian Church, 53 stops, 74 ranks – relocated from the University of Iowa's Clapp Recital Hall after the flood of 2008.
- Opus 3145, 1972, Providence, Rhode Island; Cathedral of Saints Peter and Paul, 6,616 pipes, 4 manuals, 126 ranks, 74 stops, largest mechanical action organ in North America
- Opus 3254, 1975, Lansing, Michigan; Plymouth Congregation Church, 57 stops, 75 ranks
- Opus 3262, 1975, Gainesville, Florida; Zion Lutheran Church, 17 ranks, 720 pipes
- Opus 3312, 1976, Mexico City, Mexico, New Basilica of Our Lady of Guadalupe, 5 Manuals, 116 stops, 187 ranks, 10,558 pipes.
- Opus 3322, 1976, Grand Forks, North Dakota; Calvary Lutheran Church, 2 Manuals, 17 Stops, 23 Ranks, 1,168 Pipes.
- Opus 3324, 1976, Greendale, Wisconsin; St. Stephen the Martyr Lutheran Church, 23 ranks, relocated from Chicago in 2020
- Opus 3360, 1978, Sioux Center, Iowa; Dordt University, 37 stops, 57 ranks, and 2,865 pipes
- Opus 3391, 1978, Austin, Texas; All Saints' Episcopal Church
- Opus 3414, 1979, Scranton, Pennsylvania; St. Peter's Cathedral
- Opus 3434, 1982, Melbourne, Australia; Hamer Hall (formerly Melbourne Concert Hall), Victoria Arts Centre, 60 stops, tracker action
- Opus 3700, 1993, Independence, Missouri; Temple complex of the Community of Christ, four-manual organ of 60 stops, 5,685 pipes
- Opus 3765, 1998, Chicago, Illinois; Chicago Symphony Center, 60 ranks
- Opus 3750, 1995/1996 Fort Worth, Texas; Broadway Baptist Church, 191 ranks, 129 stops, the company's largest organ to date
- Opus 3796, 2001, Wheaton, Illinois; Wheaton College, Edman Chapel
- Opus 3828, 2003, Dallas, Texas; First United Methodist Church
- Opus 3837, 2005, New York, New York; Brick Presbyterian Church
- Opus 3839, 2004, Conover, North Carolina; St. John's Lutheran Church
- Opus 3845, 2005, Lunenburg, Nova Scotia; St. John's Anglican Church
- Opus 2288, 1955, (originally Opus 806, 1919) Miramichi, New Brunswick, Canada, St. James & St. John's United Church
- Opus 3875, 2012, Kansas City, Missouri, Kauffman Center for the Performing Arts, 79 stops, 102 ranks, 5,548 pipes
- Opus 3899, 2012, Washington, D.C., Rubenstein Family Organ, John F. Kennedy Center Concert Hall
- Opus 3900, 2014, Montréal, Quebec, Canada. Grand Orgue Pierre Béique at Maison Symphonique de Montréal

== Recordings ==
There have been many recordings performed on Casavant Frères organs.

Celebrated Canadian pianist Glenn Gould recorded his 1962 album The Art of the Fugue by Bach (Columbia Records) on a 1960 Casavant Frères organ in All Saints' Kingsway Anglican Church in Toronto – available with other Art of Fugue recordings on Sony 87759. The organ was destroyed by fire in 1966. A new Casavant organ, opus 3874 (2009), replaced it.
