= Gedackt =

Type of organ pipe

Cross-section of a wooden gedackt pipe

Gedackt (also spelled gedeckt) is the name of a family of stops in pipe organ building. They are one of the most common types of organ flue pipe. The name stems from the Middle High German word gedact, meaning "capped" or "covered". In English and French organ building traditions, similar stops are referred to as "Stopped Flute" and "Bourdon" respectively.

== History ==
The concept of the stopped flute pipe (of which gedackt is a prime example) is almost as old as organ construction. As early as 1600, in Germanic organs, stopped flutes were common additions to the specification. Besides giving a distinct flute-like tone (in contrast to the more open and expressive tone of the diapason, the organ's basic voice) the stopped flutes offer a perfect ensemble stop for making combinations. Stopped flutes like the gedackt are extremely versatile in an organ specification. Certain types of organ stops go in and out of fashion over the centuries, but the stopped flute ranks like the gedackt are always present on instruments of all sizes. Even the very smallest pipe organs frequently have some form of stopped flute in the specification.

== Construction ==
Gedackt pipes can be made of either wood or metal, but in modern organ building, and the majority of historical examples, they are made of wood. They are occasionally square, but much more commonly rectangular in cross-section, the mouth being on the narrow side of the pipe. The mouth has a high cut-up (height to width ratio) to produce the fluty tone. Gedackt is a stopped pipe, as its name implies. Stopped pipes need be only 1/2 of unison length to produce unison pitch, however, it is common for many stopped ranks of pipes to be built as "open" pipes in the highest sounding notes. An open pipe, such as an 8 ft (2.4 m) Diapason, needs to be eight feet long at low "C" on the keyboard, but the capped gedackt of similar pitch need be only four feet long at that point, making the stop very compact and economical to build. As in most wood pipes, the foot, block (which contains the windway), mouthpiece and cap are hardwood. The body of the pipe is usually hardwood, but can also be built of conifer or other woods, especially in large pipes.

== Sound ==
The gedackt produces a moderately soft, bland, flute-like tone, invaluable for basic ensemble sound in the pipe organ. The stopped design eliminates many high overtones and emphasizes the 3rd overtone (and octave and a fifth above the fundamental), leaving the classic sound of the gedackt, which blends seamlessly with almost all other stops. It is similar in sound to the bourdon, but is usually softer and somewhat sweeter in tone. The bourdon's heavier construction and square-walled pipes gives it a more pronounced and weighty tone.

The gedackt's strong fundamental tone is never lost, but is absorbed into combination, making a new "whole", rather than standing alone as a distinct sound in combination with other stops. Yet, used as a solo voice, the gedackt has a contemplative and relaxing sound in its lower registers, and a singing and plaintive tone in the treble notes. Large organs will sometimes have a gedackt especially voiced for solo work, frequently labeled as a "Lieblich" ("lovely") gedackt or "Singengedackt" on the stop knob. Gedackts can be built in all pitch ranges used on the organ, but they are most common at 8 ft and 4 ft pitch in the manuals, and 16 ft pitch in the pedals. Because of this construction, when a gedackt is first sounded there is a brief octave higher pitch before quickly dropping to the fundamental. This is commonly referred to as "chiff".

It is of interest that two very small gedackt pipes, fitted with bellows, are what produce the common cuckoo bird call on the striking of a traditional mechanical cuckoo clock.
