= Reed pipe =

Type of organ pipe

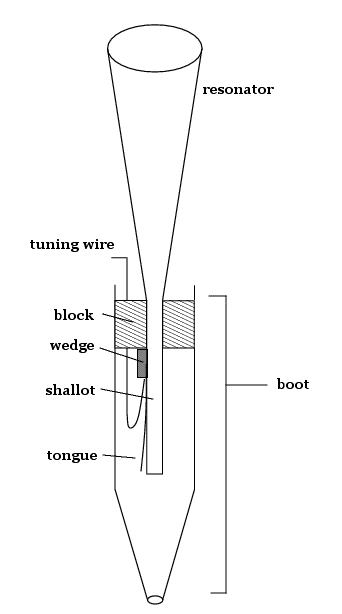
A schematic of a typical reed pipe.

A reed pipe (also referred to as a lingual pipe) is an organ pipe that is sounded by a vibrating brass strip known as a reed. Air under pressure (referred to as wind) is directed towards the reed, which vibrates at a specific pitch. This is in contrast to flue pipes, which contain no moving parts and produce sound solely through the vibration of air molecules. Reed pipes are common components of pipe organs.

== Stop ==
Reed pipes include all stops of the "Reed" class, and some stops from the "Hybrid" class. The reed stops of an organ are collectively called the "reed-work".

== Construction ==
A reed pipe comprises a metal tongue (the reed) which rests against a shallot, in which is carved a tunnel. The reed and shallot are held in place by a wooden wedge. This assembly protrudes from the underside of the block and hangs down into the boot. A tuning wire is inserted through the boot and is bent to hold the reed against the shallot. The wire is moved up or down using a tuning knife in order to change the length of the tongue that is permitted to vibrate, thereby changing the pitch produced by the pipe. The resonator joins with the upper opening of the shallot and extends above the boot. The resonator may be made in a wide variety of lengths, shapes, and configurations, depending on the desired tone quality.

An en chamade is a specific type of reed which is mounted horizontally on the organ case rather than stood vertically inside the organ case. This is done to project the tone more directly at the listener. In cases where this cannot be done, hooded reeds (generally trumpets) are used. This method of construction projects the sound in the same manner with a vertical resonator which turns at a 90-degree angle at the top.

In places where a full-length resonator will not fit, a technique called mitering is used, wherein organ pipes are created so that instead of standing straight up, they appear to make a loop in the middle of the resonator. This is done by joining several small pieces of metal together.

== Actuation ==
As wind enters the boot, it travels over the reed, causing it to vibrate against the shallot. This produces the pipe's sound. The wind passes through the shallot and up into the resonator, which focuses and refines the sound wave produced by the reed. The length of the air column as well as the length, mass, and stiffness of the reed itself, determine the frequency of the instrument.

== Free reeds ==
A less-common type of reed construction is the free reed. The term refers to two types of reeds where the tongue does not beat directly against the shallot in order to produce the reed tone, which creates a unique sound (these are most commonly used on nineteenth-century German or French organs). In one case, the free reed stop will appear from the outside like a normal reed (complete with boot, tuning wire, and resonator, etc.). The only difference lies in the action of the tongue (see above), which beats "through" the shallot (hence the German term for the reed — durchschlagend). In the other form of the reed, an enclosed boot does not exist (as in normal reed pipes); therefore, all the tongues are held together in the same chamber, as in the harmonica, accordion, or harmonium. This arrangement makes it possible to change the volume produced without changing its pitch by varying the wind pressure, which is not possible with normal organ pipes. Volume adjustment was available to the organist by means of a balanced expression pedal which varied the wind pressure delivered to the free reed stop. This type of free reed was popular among certain organ builders of the nineteenth century due to the increased interest in a more expressive aesthetic.

== Tonal characteristics ==
The tonal characteristics of reed pipes are determined by several factors, the most important of which is the interaction between the shallot and the tongue. The thickness and curve of the tongue itself play an important role in determining the tonal quality of the pipe. When voicing a reed pipe, the voicer will take great care in shaping the curve of the tongue, because this controls how the tongue beats against the shallot. Whether the shallot is cylindrical or tapered (and, in the latter case, whether or not the taper is inverted) greatly affects the pipe's timbre. Likewise, the "cut" (referring to the depth of the shallot and the shape of the opening) and the closed-end shape (whether the closed end of the shallot is flat, domed, or Schiffschen) determine whether the tone is more Baroque or more Romantic. In addition, the type of block (whether a standard shape or a French "double-block") in which the reed assembly is set has an effect on the sound.

Scaling is important when determining the final tone color of a reed pipe, though it is not of primary importance as it is in flue pipe construction. This is because reed pipe resonators simply reinforce certain partials of the sound wave; the air column inside the resonator is not the primary vibrator. The shape of the resonator, however, is quite important: an inverted-conical resonator (such as is typical with a Trumpet rank) produces more harmonics than does a cylindrical resonator (like that of a Clarinet rank).

There are generally two main types of reed stops: chorus reeds (such as the Trumpet, Clairon and Bombarde), whose main function is to blend with the flue stops and reinforce the full organ; and solo reeds or orchestral reeds (such as the Clarinet, the Oboe, and the Cor Anglais), which often (but not always) imitate orchestral instruments, and are used for quieter, solo passages (similar to woodwinds in an orchestra).
