= Vaxholm Church =

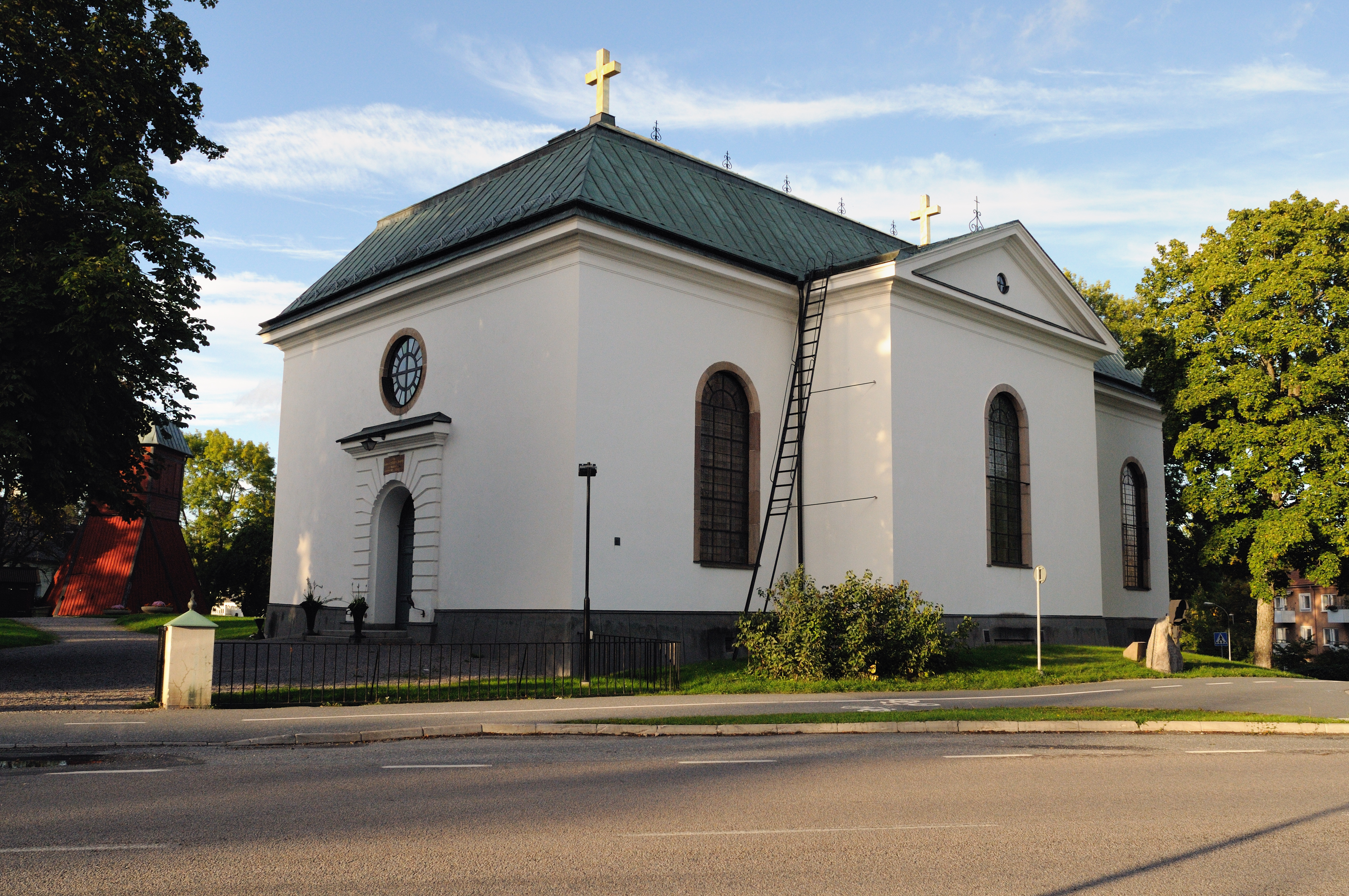
- Vaxholm Church
- Vaxholm Church
- 59°24′12″N 18°20′51″E
- Location: Vaxholm, Stockholm County
- Country: Sweden
- Denomination: Church of Sweden

Architecture
- Architect(s): C F Adelcrantz, Olof Tempelman
- Architectural type: Chapel
- Style: Neoclassical
- Completed: 1803

Administration
- Diocese: Diocese of Stockholm
- Parish: Vaxholm parish

Vaxholm Church (Swedish: Vaxholms kyrka) is a church in central Vaxholm, Sweden. The chapel is a single-nave building built in the Neoclassical style. It was completed in 1803 according to drawings by Carl Fredrik Adelcrantz and Olof Tempelman. It replaced an earlier wooden church in Vaxholm.

== Background ==
=== 16th century ===
As early as the 16th century Vaxholm had a small chapel or meeting house to gather for worship located where the customs house has stood since 1738, by the water across from Vaxholm Fortress (Kastellsundet).

=== The old church ===
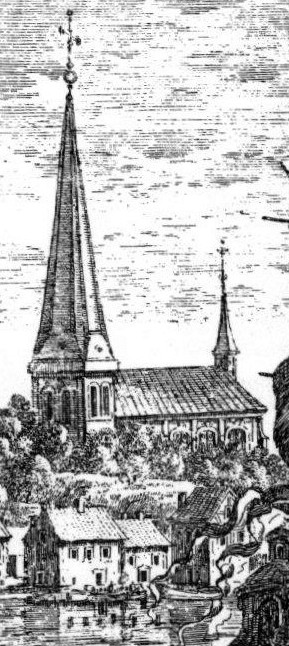
Image of the old church taken from Suecia Antiqua et Hodierna by Erik Dahlbergh

In the middle of the 17th century, plans were made to expand Vaxholm. Tax breaks were introduced and the population grew to 163 residents. Vaxholm became its own parish in 1644, and the construction of a more solid wooden church was begun. The church building was financed by mantal and livestock allowances. Drots Per Brahe made the largest contribution, and the church was named St. Peter's Church (Petrikyrkan) after him.

There is some question about where this church was located. The old church was either higher up in Vaxholm, slightly west of today's church, or down by Kastellsundet. It was made of wood and chipboard and had a tower, 28 rows of benches and three stands. Two of the stands were intended for the citizens of the city and the crew of the third fortress. It is featured in Erik Dahlbergh's book.

In 1735, lightning destroyed the belfry. In 1746, the old church was considered to be in such poor condition that it was not worth repairing, but several fixtures were transferred to the new one. The only thing today that attests to the old church is a memorial stone outside the new building with this inscription:

Anno 1644 funderades sanct Petri kyrckia uthi Waxholm genom fordom praepositi och pastoris then ehrewyrdige och wällärde Herr Erichsons Hellbergs påkostnad anno 1678.

On the other side of the stone is the image of "a poor man's rifle" and a text about donating to the house of God and the poor.

=== Current church ===
The first stone for the present church was laid on 20 September 1760, on the rear east side of the church. The construction took time, and the sign above the entrance indicates that the church was not consecrated until 1803. Superintendent Carl Fredrik Adelcrantz was the architect who designed and would finally approve the church building. Architect Olof Tempelman worked under Adelcrantz as an assistant. When Adelcrantz resigned his public duties in 1795, Tempelman completed the construction. The funds raised were not enough to build the planned tower. The idea was to add this later, and a temporary wooden belfry was built instead. It is still used today. The church was dedicated to the then king, Gustav IV Adolf, and was named Gustav Adolfskyrkan.

Vaxholm's church is an aisleless (single-nave) building with a short cross arm and a full-width quire. The building faces east–west with its sacristy to the north. The church is covered by a mansard and hip roof. The sacristy was built in 1896 by architect Johan Laurentz, when the south entrance was blocked and arched windows were inserted into the gable end. In 1962, the roof was replaced with copper plate. The well-preserved interior is covered by a coffered ceiling.

=== Expansion and renovation ===
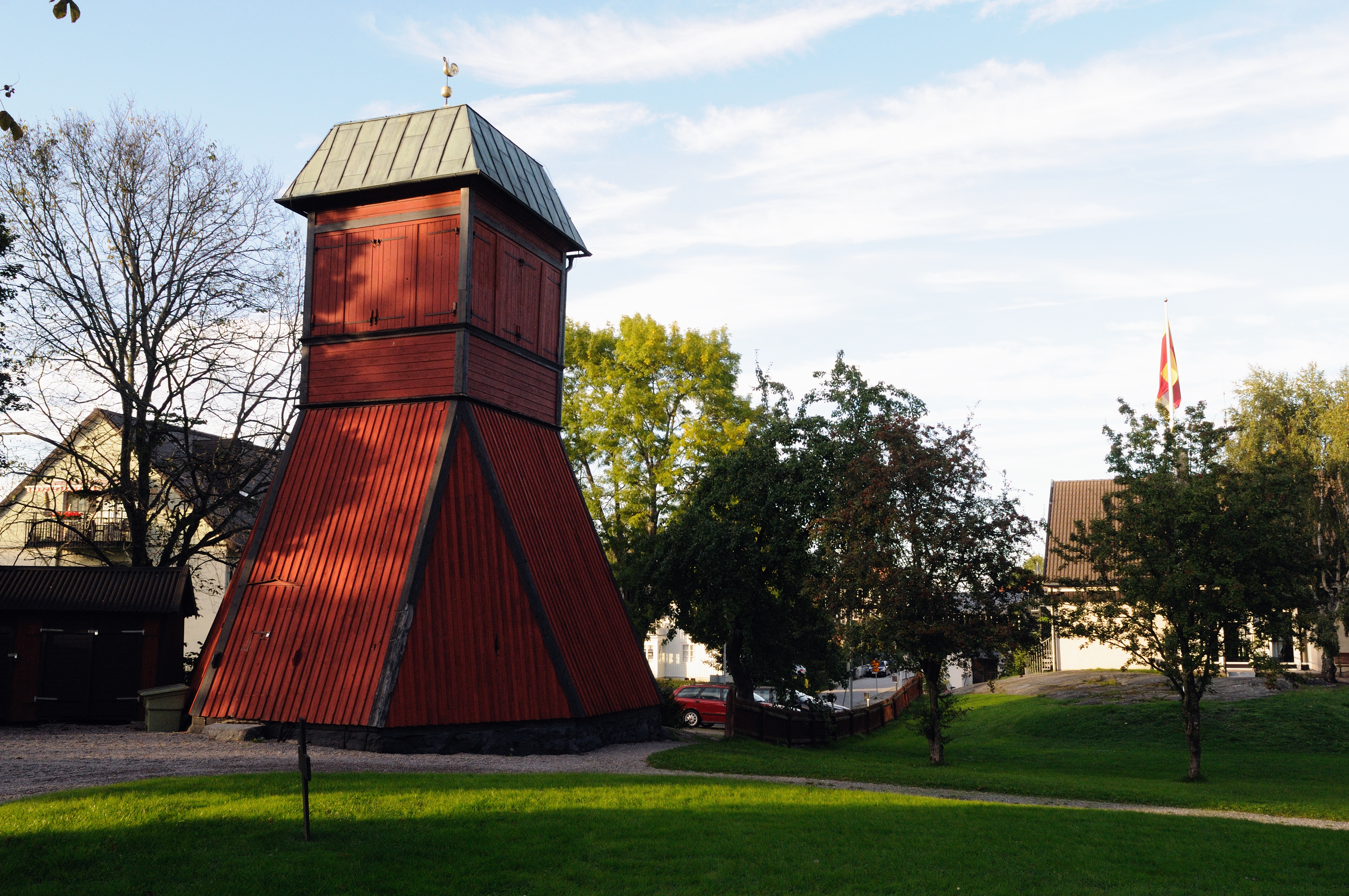
Temporary belfry

- 1800–1818 burial chambers were built in the cemetery.
- 1896 – a major renovation was carried out led by Johan Laurentz. A small sacristy was added, along with an arched chancel window with stained glass, replaced the altar and put in a pulpit, both by the artist Karl Nilsson, put in windows in the arms of the transept and in the east gable, re-walled the south side entrance, took removed penthouse in the transept and built new benches.
- Early 20th century – the 18th century crucifix was renovated
- 1909 – the organ was installed by Erik Adolf Setterquist
- 1926 – renovation was carried out by architect Sven Brandel
- 1936 – the cemetery was extended towards the park to the west.
- 1950 – the belfry was repaired, and the front rows of pews of the church were removed.
- 1951 – the attic was isolated and renovated after being attacked by pests.
- 1962 – a major renovation was carried out led by Vaxholm's city architect Lars O Åkerlund. The metal roof was replaced with one of copper, the cross was gilded on the roof, the outer walls were plastered, the windows were given new dimensions and the stairs at the entrance were renewed.
- 1967–69 – a cloakroom, toilet, cleaning room and waiting room were built under the organ gallery. The organ was modernized by expanding it to 22 parts. The sacristy was repaired and the lighting in the church was changed.
- 1978 – a new choir organ with seven parts was purchased.
- 1979 – new insulating glass interior windows were installed.
- 1986 – the main entrance was rebuilt with a new staircase and wheelchair ramp. These were changed again a few years later.
- 1994–95 – the floor of the church room was redone, the interior was repainted and the buildings under the organ gallery were changed, by, among other things, enlarging the window to make it brighter. All according to a proposal by Hilding Lögdberg who also built the Resarö chapel parish house.
- 1998 the outer walls of the church and the Åkerberg Funeral Choir were plastered.

== Decoration ==
=== Man of Sorrows ===
In the left corner of the choir is an 83 centimetres (33 in) painted wooden sculpture of Christ in the form of the Man of Sorrows. It may be from the early 17th century. It is one of the earliest figures of this type.

=== Paintings ===
Paintings
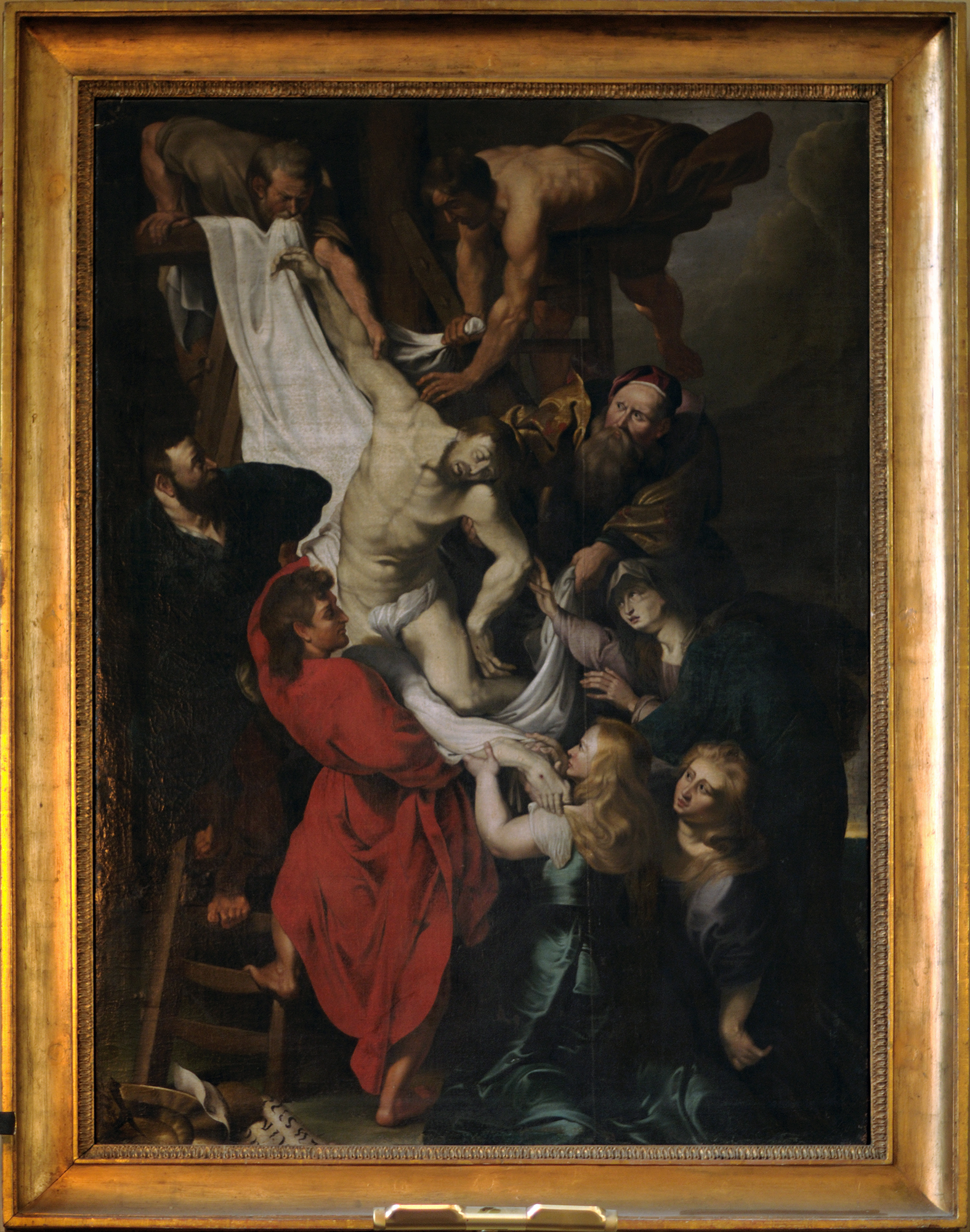
Copy of Rubens' The Descent from the Cross

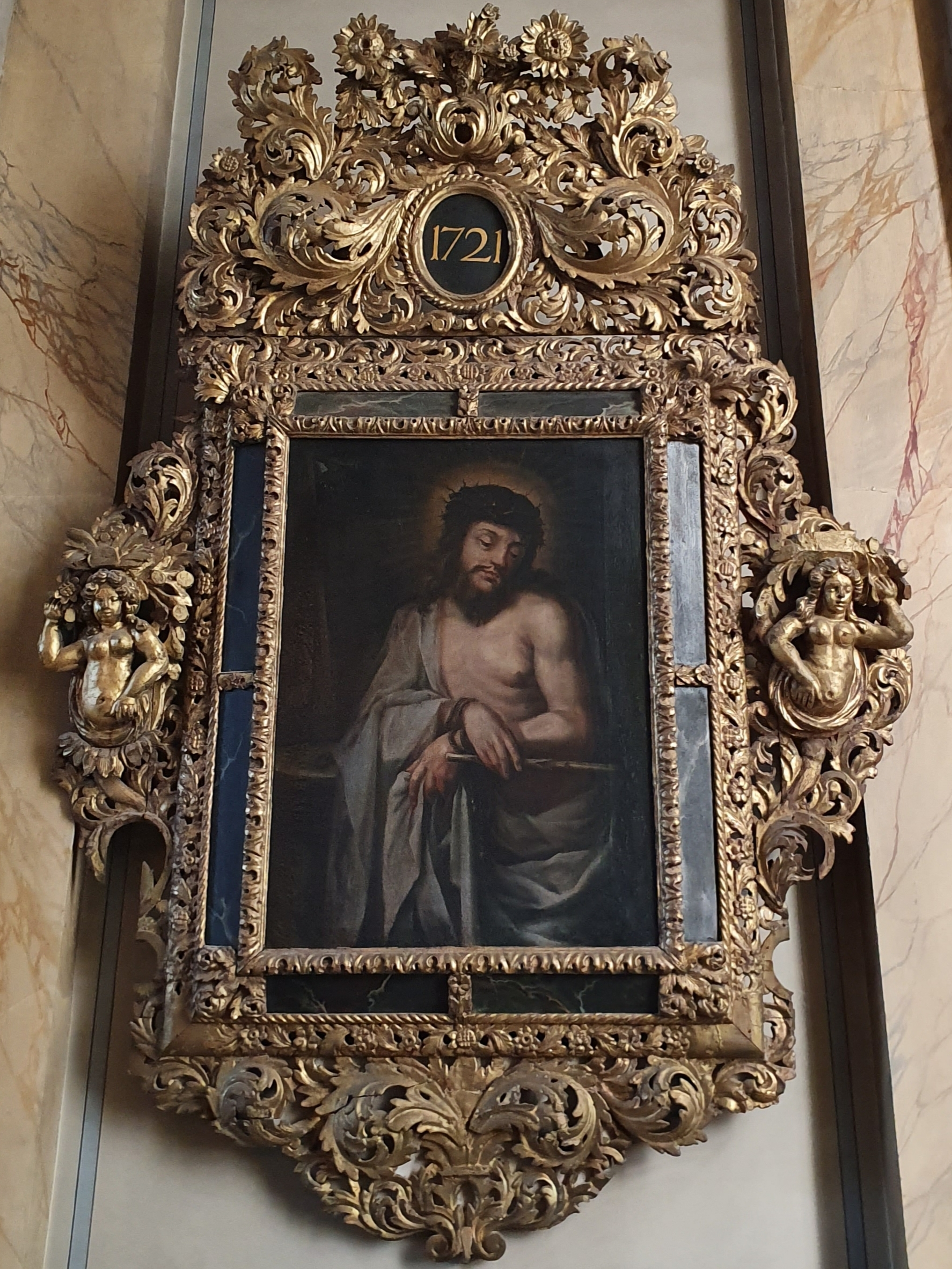
The thorn crowned Christ

On each side of the choir window hang two paintings. To the left, a copy of Rubens' The Descent from the Cross. Rubens' original has hung in Antwerp's Cathedral of Our Lady since 1611, and is a model for many altarpieces. The painting was donated to the church in 1816 by the Baron von Post. To the right hangs what is the altarpiece in the old church. The motif is the "crowned Jesus" and the frame is believed to be from Burchard Precht's workshop in Stockholm. The painting is considered to be by a successor to Carlo Dolci, who organized a school in Florence for this type of artwork.

=== Crucifix ===
On the altar is a 65 centimetres (26 in) high Gothic style crucifix with Jesus attached in a Gothic way to the cross with a single nail. The body is sculpted in wood and is believed to be from the late 18th century. When the church was renovated in the early 20th century, a new arm was made and the cross replaced. It has "INRI" engraved on the cross above the crown of thorns.

=== Baptismal font ===
The baptismal font was made from Gotland sandstone during the late 14th century for the Riddarholmen Church. In 1677 it was donated to Vaxholm. By 1835 the church had moved the font to a shed in the cemetery. The head of the Vaxholm Fortress, Commander Panchen, took possession of the font and it was converted into a birdbath in the commander's garden, Blynäsgården. Freiherr Frans Oscar Leuhusen took over the Blynäsgården around 1850. In 1933, his relatives understood that the piece was a baptismal font and it was returned to the church. It stood in the cemetery until the early 1960s, when it was taken back into the church. More than a hundred years as a birdbath had left its mark, however, and in 1981 the pastor asked the National Heritage Board for permission to move the baptismal font. Blynäsgården got its birdbath back in 2008.

== Organ ==
The church organ dates to the mid 18th century:

- 1756 – organist Gabriel Lind built an organ with 4 parts in the former church.
- 1809 – Olof Schwan rebuilt the organ
- 1909 – The current organ was built by E A Setterquist & Son, Örebro, and is a mechanical organ with rosewood boxes. The organ stands on the west stand. The organ has three free combinations and an automatic pedal change. In the 1950s and again 1962, the organ was rearranged. In 2012, the organ was restored by Åkerman & Lund Orgelbyggeri, whereby the late romantic original disposition was restored. The instrument now has 22 parts, two manuals and a pedal. The facade is the original, non-sounding, from 1908.

Manual I	Manual II	Pedal	Coupler
Principal 16'	Bourdon 16´	Sub-bass 16´	I/P
Bourdon 16'	Flute Principal 8'	Bourdon 8'	II/P
Principal 8'	Principal 4'	Choralbass 4'	II/I
Harmonic Flute 8'	Flute Octaviante 4'	Trombone 16'	I 4'/I
Octave 4'	Nasard 2 2/3'		II 16'/II
Gedackt 4'	Waldflöte 2'
Quintadena 2 2/3'	Tierce 1 3/5'
Octave 2'
Sifflet 1'
Mixture

=== Choir organ ===
The current choir organ, a mechanical organ, was built in 1978 by Nels Munck Mogensen, Hovmantorp. It is placed high in the choir loft.

Manual	Pedal	Coupler
Gedackt 8'	Sub-bass 16'	Man/Ped
Chimney Flute 4'	Gedackt 8'
Geigen 2'
Quint 1 1/3'
Sifflet 1'

=== Further listening ===
- Orgelliv : sju sekel i Stockholms stifts kyrkor / redaktör: Christina Nilsson; foto: Magnus Aronson, Mats Åsman. Stockholm: Kulturhistoriska bokförlaget. 2012. ISBN 978-91-87151-04-0. SELIBR 13609452. "CD with music on the church's main organ performed by Anna Holm"

== Gallery ==
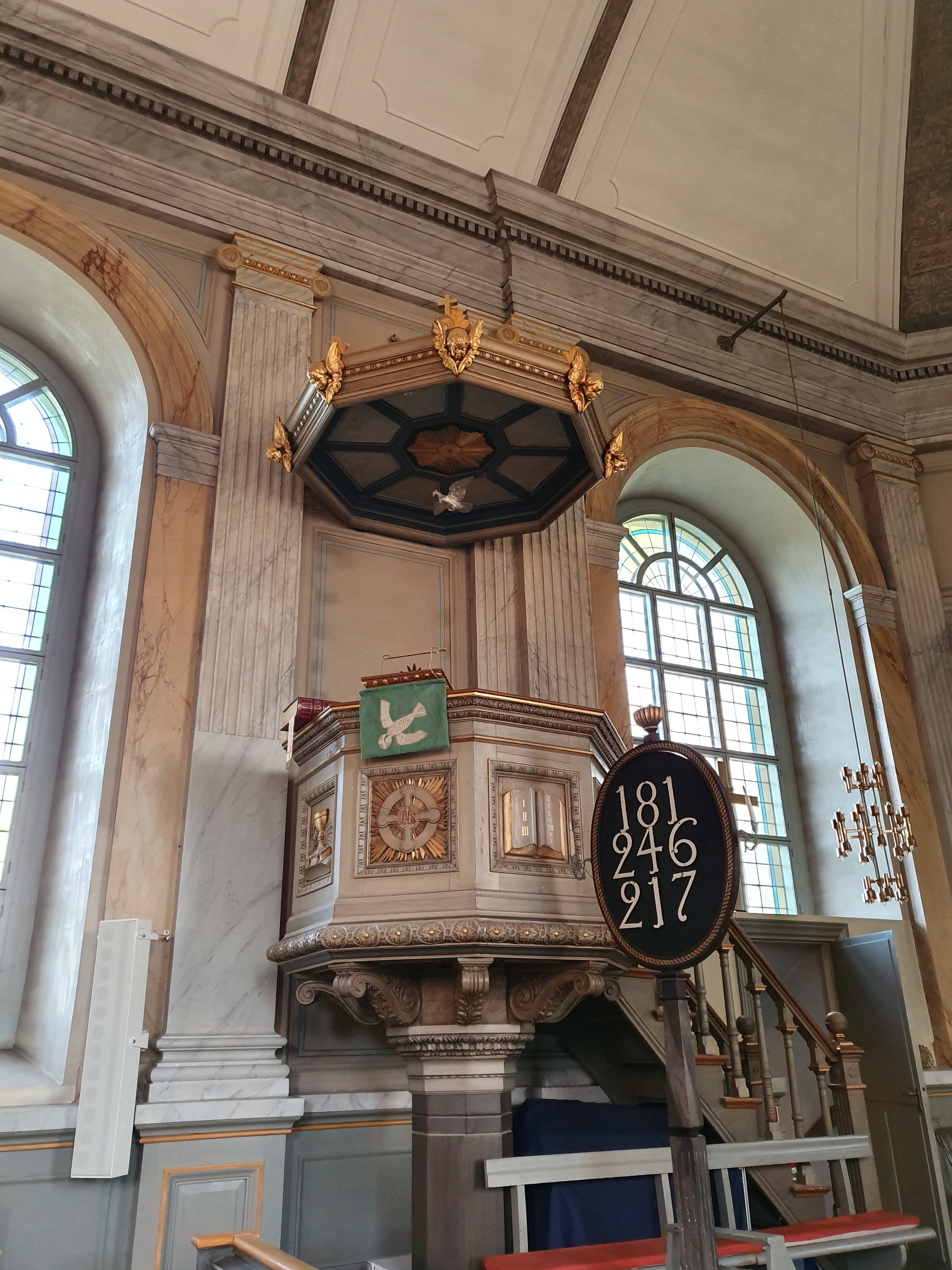
Pulpit

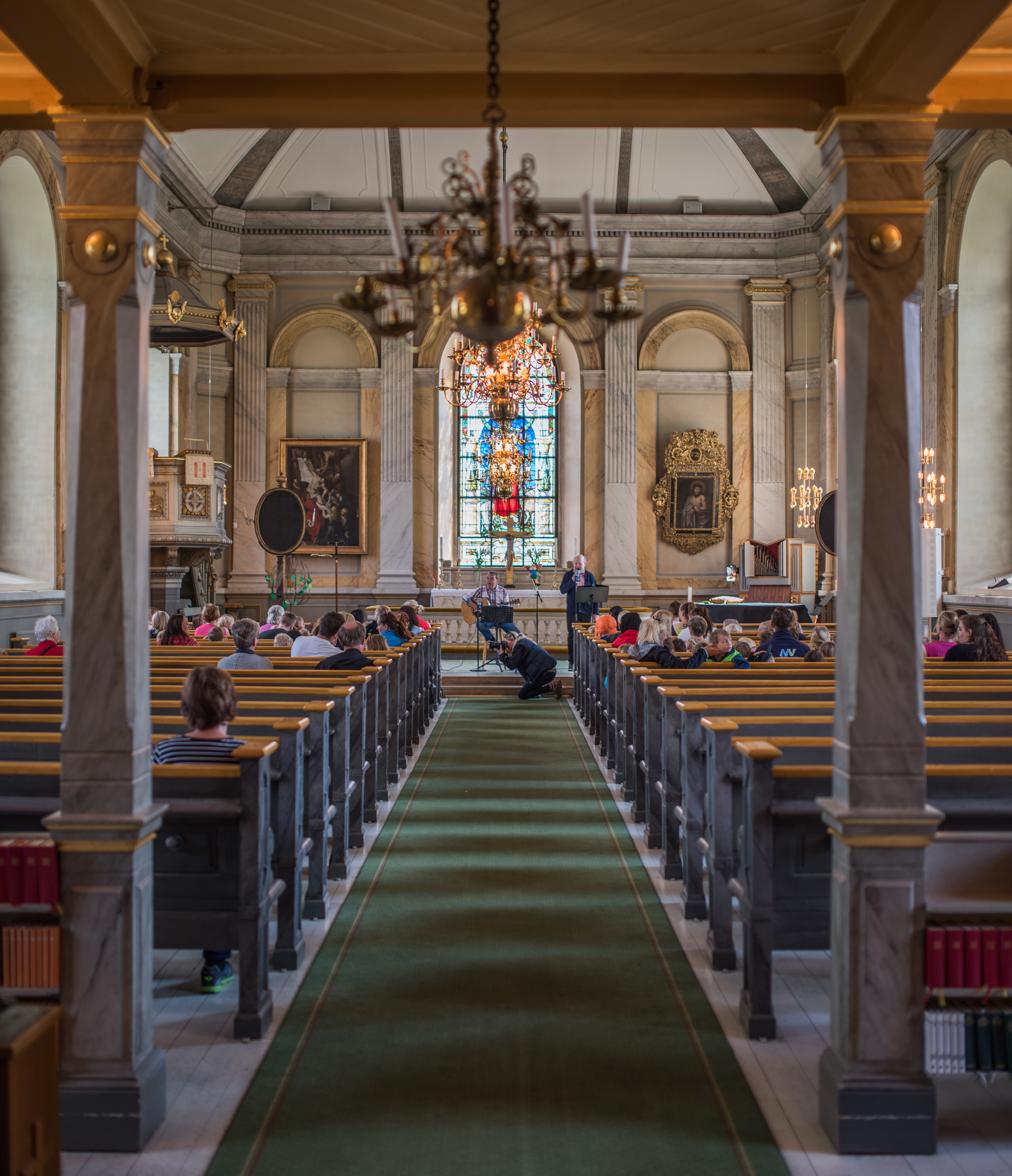
The church hall during a concert

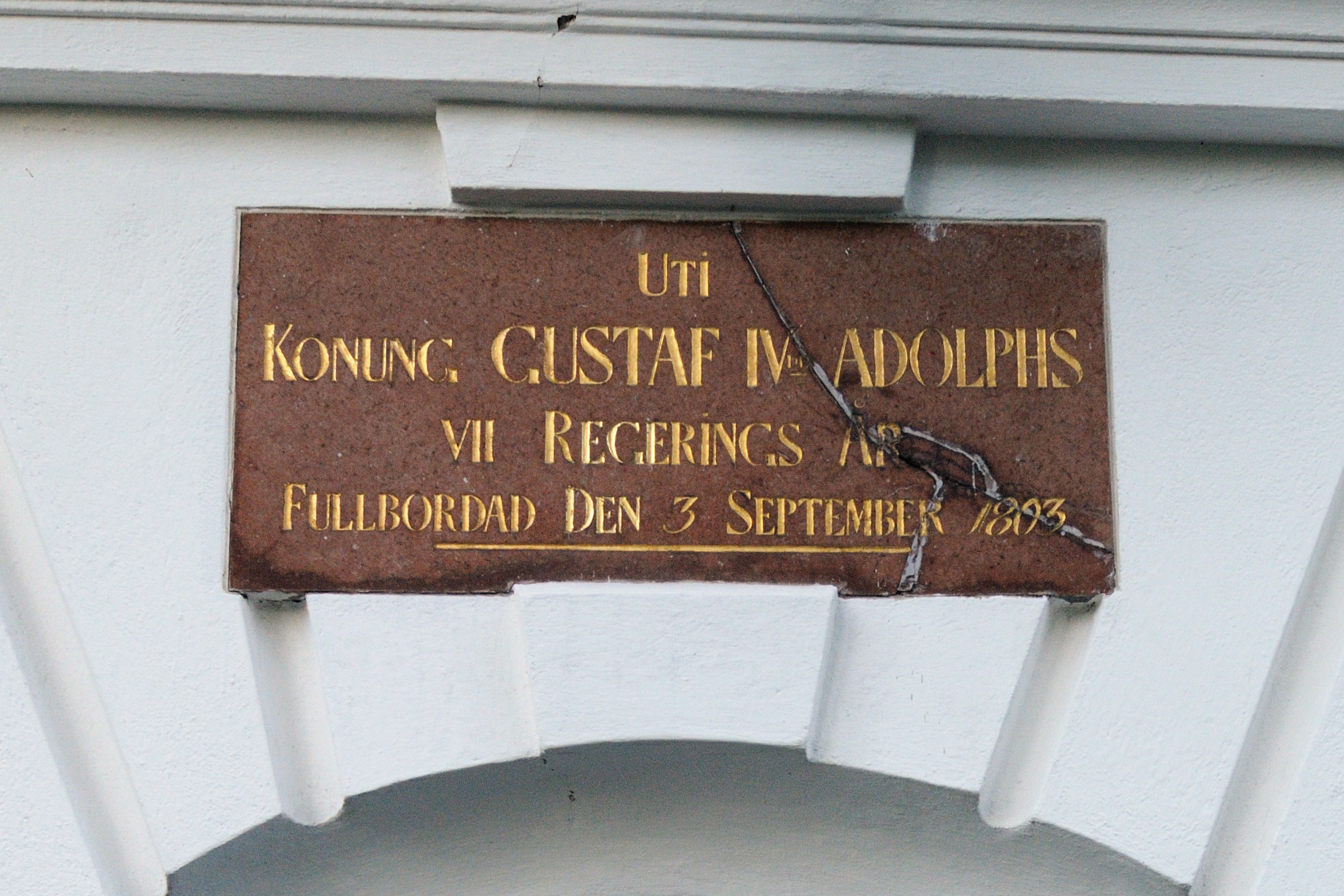
Sign above the entrance

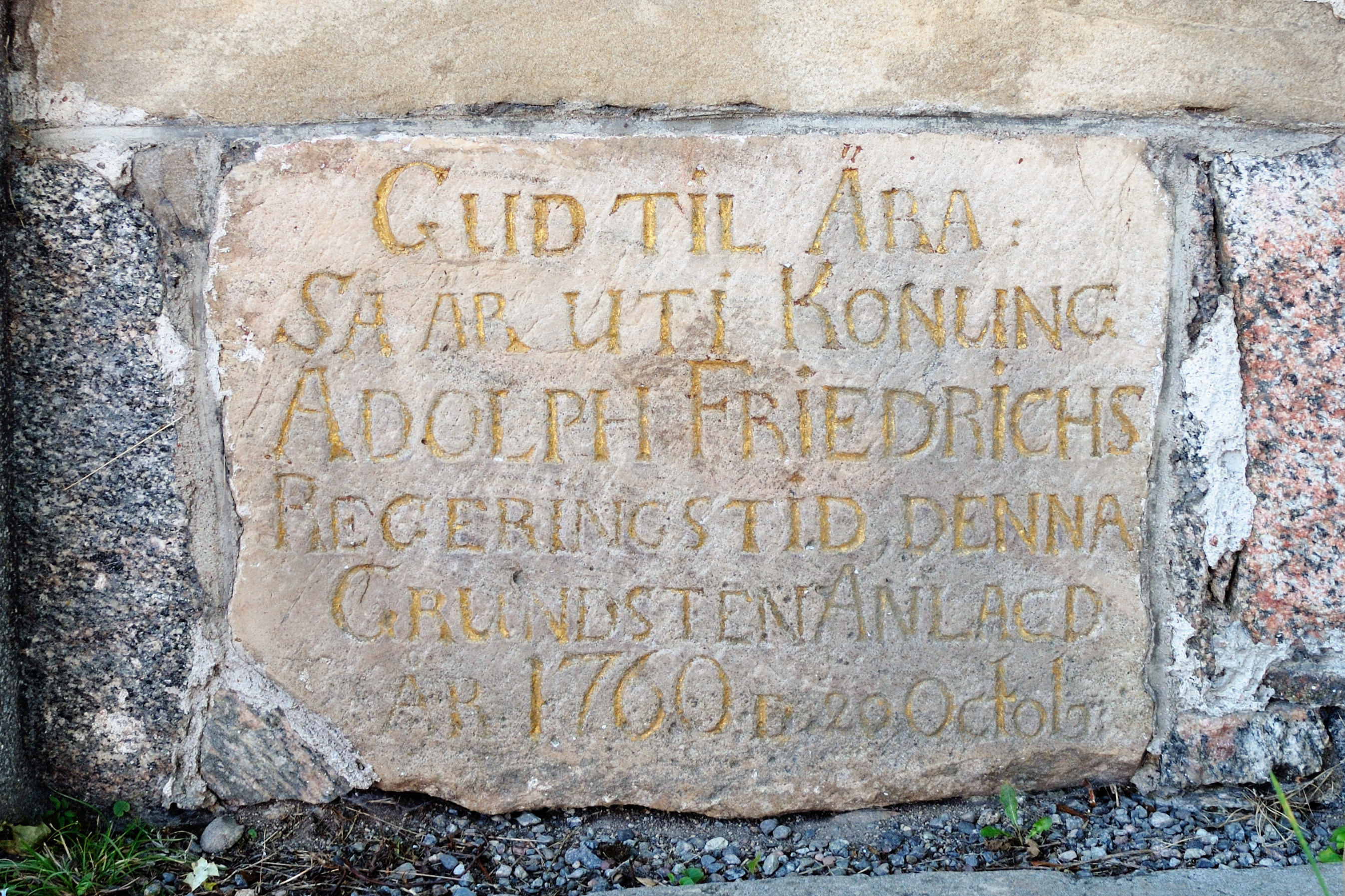
Foundation stone

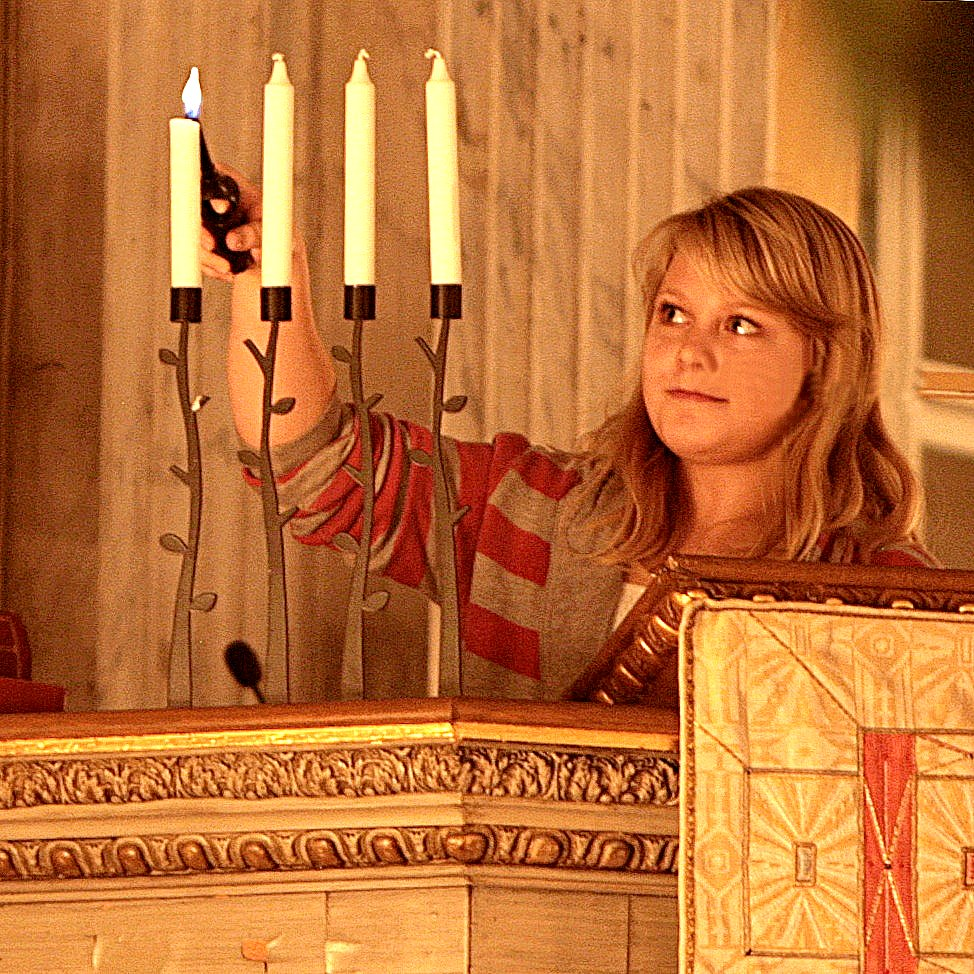
Lighting the first candle on Advent Sunday, 2008

== Bibliography ==
- Dahlbergh, Erik (1670). Suecia Antiqua et Hodierna. "Band 1 Plansch 147"
- Boëthius, Ulf; Eriksson, Monica (1980). Vägvisare till kyrkorna i Stockholms län (in Swedish). Stockholm: LiberFörlag. ISBN 91-38-04976-7. SELIBR 7259713.
- Harnesk, Paul, ed. (1964). Vem är vem?. 2, Svealand utom Stor-Stockholm (in Swedish). Stockholm: Bokförlaget Vem är vem. p. 905. ISBN 91-38-04976-7. SELIBR 53510.
- Legars, Niss Maria (2004). "Vaxholms kyrka" (in Swedish). Stockholm: Stockholms stift.
- Kilström, Bengt Ingmar, ed. (1977). Vaxholms kyrka. Upplands kyrkor (in Swedish). Vol. 174. Strängnäs: Ärkestiftets Stiftsråd, Stängnäs tryckeri. SELIBR 178394.
- Hülpers, Abraham Abrahamsson (1773). Historisk Afhandling om Musik och Instrumenter särdeles om Orgwerks Inrättningen i Allmänhet jemte Kort Beskrifning öfwer Orgwerken i Swerige (in Swedish). Västerås: Johan Laurentius Horrn. p. 253. SELIBR 2413220.
- Vaxholms församling (2011). Vaxholms kyrka (Uppkopierat infoblad från kyrkan) (in Swedish). "Information compiled by Vaxholms parish"
