= Listed buildings in Kronoberg County =

There are 36 listed buildings (Swedish: byggnadsminne) in Kronoberg County.

== Alvesta Municipality ==
Image	Name	Premises	Number of buildings	Year built	Architect	Coordinates	ID
	Alvesta stationshus	Alvesta 11:1	1			56.89904°N 14.55685°E	21300000013690
	Alvesta tingshus	Gästgivaren 2	2			56.89846°N 14.55139°E	21300000025711
	Gåvetorps herrgård	Gåvetorp 6:1, 7:10	16			56.95051°N 14.58205°E	21300000013697
	Halmhyddorna på Kronobergshed	Dansjö 2:41	2			56.97150°N 14.56500°E	21300000013717
	Huseby bruk	Huseby 1:1 m fl	27			56.77858°N 14.59004°E	21300000013721
	Riksdagsmannagården	Krigaren 1	5			56.89831°N 14.55270°E	21300000013691

== Lessebo Municipality ==
Image	Name	Premises	Number of buildings	Year built	Architect	Coordinates	ID
	Glashusen i Kosta	Kosta 3:30 m fl	5			56.85064°N 15.39829°E	21300000026402
	Södra kyrkstallarna i Ljuder	Ljuders prästgård 1:13 (fd1:1	1			56.68042°N 15.31615°E	21300000013734
	Transjö Folkets hus	Transjö 1:53 (fd1:5	2			56.78827°N 15.41636°E	21300000013732

== Ljungby Municipality ==
Image	Name	Premises	Number of buildings	Year built	Architect	Coordinates	ID
	Kvarteret Gertrud 25	Gertrud 25	2			56.82996°N 13.93950°E	21300000018415
	Hamneda gamla gästgivaregård	Hamneda 1:7	2			56.69256°N 13.84240°E	21300000013736
	Sällebergs herrgård	Sälleberg 1:11	2			56.85725°N 14.23291°E	21300000013741

== Markaryd Municipality ==
There are no listed buildings in Markaryd Municipality.

== Tingsryd Municipality ==
Image	Name	Premises	Number of buildings	Year built	Architect	Coordinates	ID
	Linneryds kyrkstallar, sockenstuga	Linneryd 3:5	5			56.65667°N 15.13033°E	21000001216420
	Linneryds sockenmagasin	Linneryd 5:89	1			56.65785°N 15.13158°E	21000001468682
	Lidhems säteri	Line 7:1	14			56.66209°N 14.88210°E	21300000013745

== Uppvidinge Municipality ==
Image	Name	Premises	Number of buildings	Year built	Architect	Coordinates	ID
	Lenhovda gamla tingshus	Lenhovda 3:15	2			56.99715°N 15.28520°E	21300000013750
	Norrhults Folkets hus	Norrhult 3:579	3			57.12103°N 15.16593°E	21300000013752
	Rosdala glasbruk	Norrhult 60:1, 60:3	23			57.12204°N 15.17359°E	21300000013756

== Växjö Municipality ==
Image	Name	Premises	Number of buildings	Year built	Architect	Coordinates	ID
	Växjö gamla gymnasium/Karoliner huset	Domkyrkan 1 previously Gymnasiet 1	1			56.87781°N 14.81229°E	21300000013788
	Växjö teater	Tullen 17 previously Teatern 6	1	1849	Theodor Anckarsvärd	56.87984°N 14.80341°E	21300000013789
	Smålands museum, Växjö	Museet 3	2			56.87593°N 14.80795°E	21300000013786
	Dädesjö gamla prästgård	Dädesjö 1:9; f.d 1:1	8			57.01231°N 15.10753°E	21300000013780
	Lilla Björka	Berg 16:1, 17:1	3			57.08057°N 14.71148°E	21300000013763
	Sankt Sigfrids sjukhus	Växjö 11:40 previously Stg 2097	2			56.86690°N 14.82719°E	21300000013790
	Gårdsby säteri	Gårdsby 6:13	20			56.96000°N 14.89335°E	21300000016697
	Jätsbergs herrgård	Jätsberg 1:18	11			56.68016°N 14.81202°E	21300000013783
	Lilla Gunnarbo	Hov ödegård 10	2			56.88837°N 14.80686°E	21300000013791
	Logehuset i Drev	Drev 8:4	1			57.06895°N 14.99997°E	21300000013764
	Ordenshuset Asa-Thor	Asa-Kråketorp S:1	1			57.18445°N 14.77384°E	21300000013762
	Skälsnäs ryttmästarboställe	Skälsnäs 1:1	7			56.98094°N 14.74232°E	21300000013784
	Gamla Riksbanken, Växjö	Lyktan 4	1			56.87880°N 14.81074°E	21300000013794
	Residenset, Växjö	Residenset 1	1			56.87895°N 14.80946°E	21300000013792
	Åryds bruk	Åryd 1:31	1			56.82459°N 14.98792°E	21300000013782
	Östrabo biskopsgård	Östrabo 1 previously 1:1	7	1792–1796	Olof Tempelman	56.87955°N 14.81888°E	21300000013795

== Älmhult Municipality ==
Image	Name	Premises	Number of buildings	Year built	Architect	Coordinates	ID
	Emanuelskapellet	Sköldsbygd 1:11 (tidigare Sköldsbygd Östergård 1:11	1			56.53951°N 13.95486°E	21300000013823
	Råshult	Råshult 2:1	3			56.61824°N 14.19947°E	21300000013827
	Stora Kölaboda	Kölaboda 3:23 (f.d 3:2	3			56.54986°N 13.97590°E	21300000013825
