= Mense =

Form of ecclesiastical income in the Catholic Church

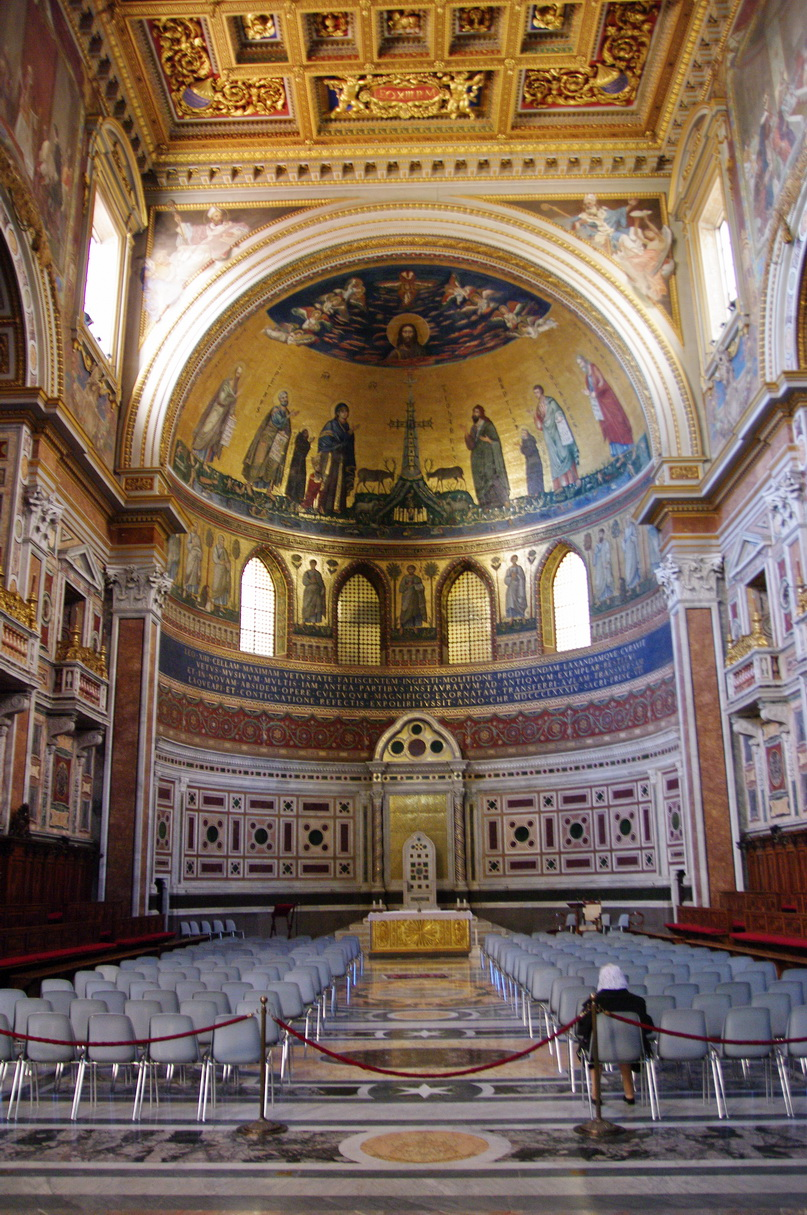
Seat of the Bishop of Rome in the apse of the Archbasilica of Saint John Lateran

A mense (from Latin mensa 'table') is the name of a form of ecclesiastical income in the Catholic Church. Historically, the mense was a land tax that was used as income for its holder (i.e. bishop, abbot, canons or monks, pastor, etc.). In an abbey this support was called the In commendam and was divided into three lots, one for the commendatory abbot, one for the religious community and another devoted to the payment of expenses.

== Background ==
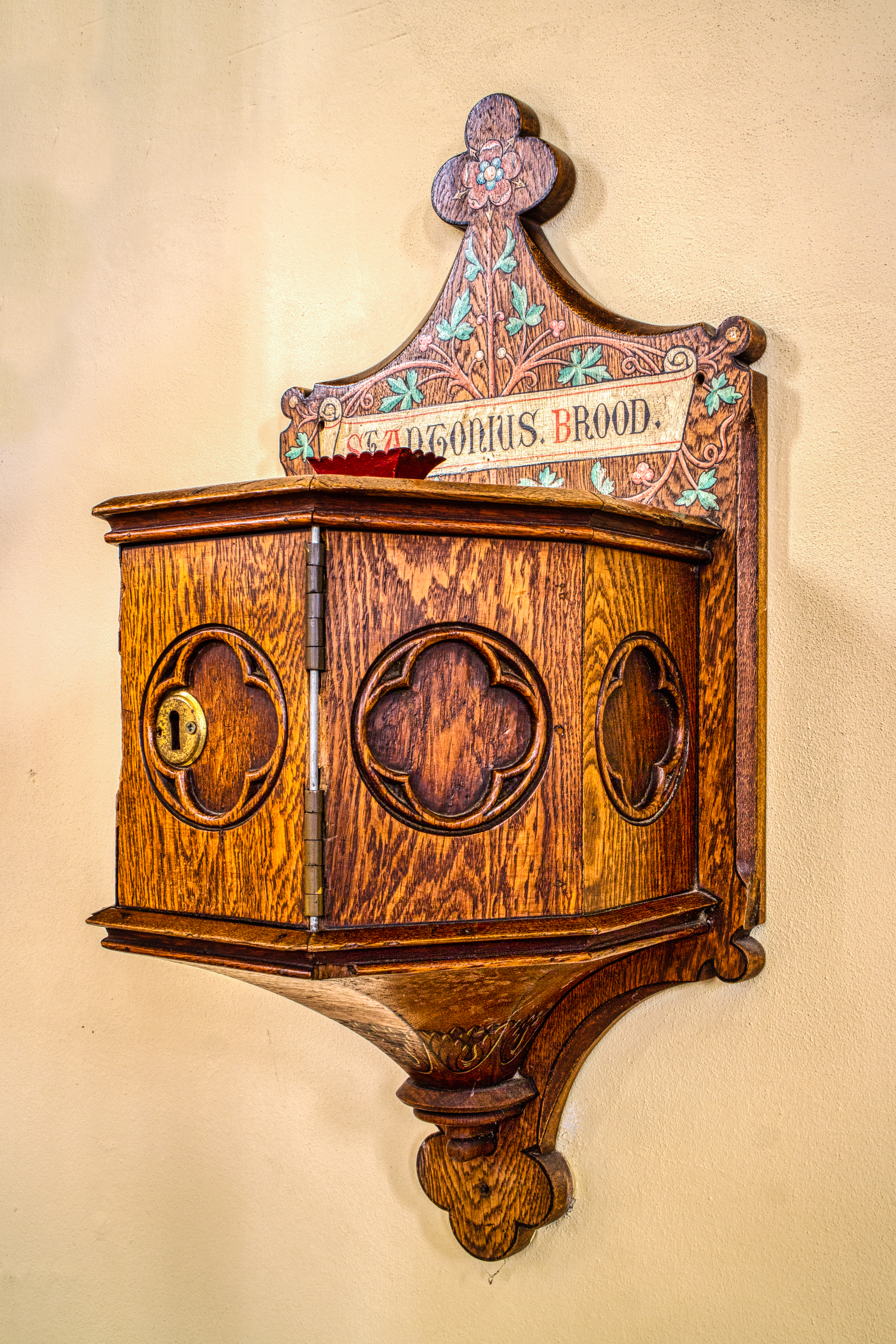
Offertory box

In the early church, all the property of a diocese was held by the cathedral church, and was administered by the local bishop. The bishop administered the resources himself, through his œconomus, or his deacons. Local clergy received a portion of the revenues by a formula dictated locally, or at the discretion of the bishop. As the church grew, parishes outside of the episcopal city began to administer their own wealth and property. After the 5th century bishops began granting church property to local clerics by way of "precarium" (i.e. a revocable land grant) that they could use for their own support. Over time, these land grants were abused, and in response arose the mense during the rule of the Carolingian dynasty.

The mense is that portion of the property of a church which is designated to covering the expenses either of the prelate, or the religious community, serving the church and administered at their discretion. In a cathedral, to which both the bishop and a chapter sit, the bishop's "episcopal mensa" is distinct from that of the chapter.

Episcopal mense

The episcopal mense (Latin: mensa episcopalis) is the material support from a Catholic diocese for the support and maintenance of the local bishop, or to the abbot, his residence, and the diocesan curia. Though it is governed by canon law, in countries like France and Italy, it is also regulated by public law.

Capitular mense

The capitular mense (Latin: mensa capitularis), is the share of ecclesiastical revenue designated to the maintenance and support of the canons or monks. The division of the capitular mense between each canon is called the prebend. After the Investiture Controversy in the 12th century, these revenues became insufficient and were supplemented by the addition of parish benefits, and chaplaincies to the canonical prebends.

Curial mense

The curial mense (Latin: mensa curialis) is support given to the parish priest or minister. It is administered by the parish priest, under the supervision of the bishop and the parish council.

== See also ==
- Diocesan Institute for the Support of the Clergy
- Mantal
- Tithe
