= Mantal =

Obsolete unit of measurement

A mantal (Finnish: manttaali) is an obsolete unit once used in Finland and Sweden to measure the size and productivity of a piece of land. In the 1900s, the mantal lost its relevance because crown land taxes ceased to exist and the government started drawing revenue from income taxes. Today, mantal values are only used in connection with some rural obligations and rights, while the size of farms in Finland is reported in hectares.

A mantal measures both physical area and monetary worth as it takes into account the productivity of the land. It is a cameral measurement instrument used to gauge the wealth of a farm to determine its apportionment. According to M. Sjöström, in essence the mantal values for farms in a village show their share of the village's lands.

A landed estate's share of the joint properties of a village (such as bodies of water, undeveloped common land, and some specific things) is defined by its mantal value. The mantal value was also used as a basis for taxation. A farm had to pay a fixed annual land tax and several other taxes (i.e. auxiliary taxes and tithes).

== Background ==
In late medieval and early modern government, a "mantal" referred to a warrior who served a group of farmers. The term evolved to represent a group of farms that supported a mounted warrior, his horse and military equipment. According to M. Sjöström, the government in those days viewed the country and its revenues as a means of providing armed troops, rather than in terms of a population to be fed. Kiesi states that a mantal was a unit which described how many men were in a household. For example, if a family cultivating a farm had two adult brothers, then the farm was valued at 2 mantals.

Another explanation of the mantal is that of one man cultivating a plot to feed his nuclear family, but some argue against that idea, citing examples of bunches of farms of about 0.05 mantals which each fed one household (one nuclear family and perhaps a few more persons). Against this it is argued that the one warrior model was more meaningful from the perspective of the governments of those ages.

According to Kiesi, a farm of one mantal was considered large. Hectarages of estates of one mantal were around 500–1000 hectares. In some regions of Finland this was considered a manor, not merely one farm. Kiesi further states that hectarages of farms were totally dependent on what kind of land the farm owned. A one mantal farm in northern Finland was larger than one in more fertile southern Finland.

Mantal values were assigned to real estate in Finland and Sweden in the early 1500s. In the late 1600s, the unit's value was drastically adjusted throughout Finland, resulting in the so-called new mantals based on production valuation, and since that time its value has been fixed in Sweden and Finland. Of course, when a farm was divided, its mantal value was also divided, so the sum of the mantal values of the new farms was equal to the mantal value of the original farm. In the 1600s, most farms already had mantal values which were less than one. Divisions in the 1800s and 1900s led to even smaller values.

Since about 1720, Finnish land records of independent farms have generally contained the following information: jurisdictional district, parish, village, number in the village, number of households, old mantal value and new mantal value, along with the nature of the land and how the farm's taxes were used.

In the 1900s, mantal values were no longer relevant as crown land taxes ceased to exist and the government started drawing revenue from income taxes. Today, mantal values are only used in connection with some rural obligations and rights, while the size of farms in Finland is reported in hectares. In Finland, as of 1997, land surveying operations no longer calculate mantal values for new divisions of estates.

== See also ==
- Livestock allowances
- Mense

== Bibliography ==
- Sjöström, M (January 2011). Medieval landed inheritances of the Junkar and Vilken lineages of Vehkalahti, Finland. Vol. 3. pp. 425–461.
