= Livestock allowances =

Livestock allowances were a historical Swedish tax, originating as early as 1539 but which from 1620 were paid out with certain smaller amounts for various livestock animals and for acres of seed on every homestead in Sweden.

As early as 1642, the livestock allowance became a standing property tax, two thaler per mantal, and amounted to the mantal interest. With other basic taxes, the livestock money was written off in accordance with decisions by the Riksdags in 1885 and 1892.

== See also ==
- Taxation in Sweden
