= Olof Tempelman =

Swedish architect

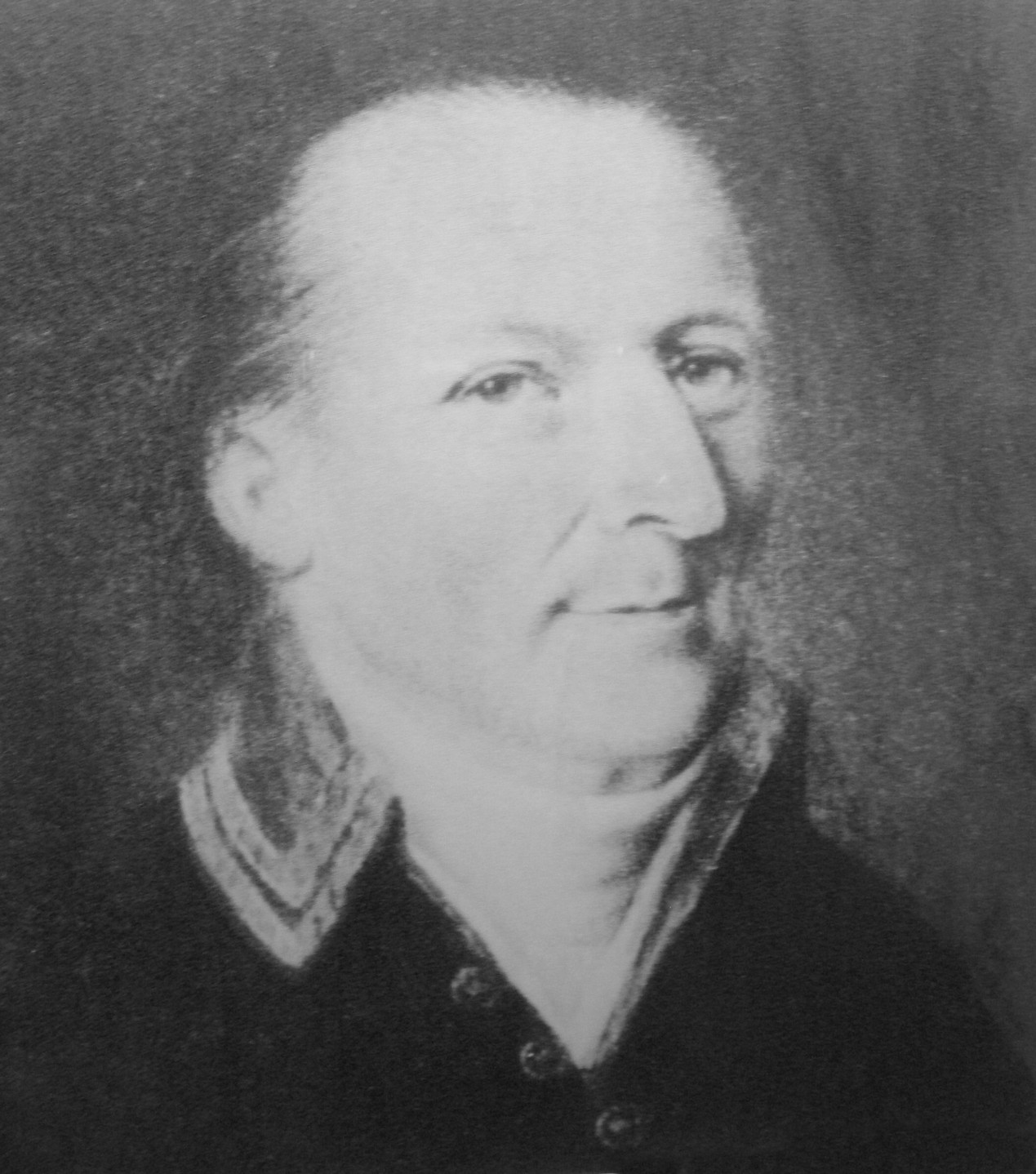
- Born: Olof Samuel Tempelman; February 21, 1745; Källstad, Östergötland, Sweden
- Died: July 27, 1816 (aged 71); Stockholm, Sweden
- Occupations: Architect, professor at the Royal Swedish Academy of Arts

Olof Samuel Tempelman (February 21, 1745 in Källstad, Östergötland – July 27, 1816 in Stockholm) was a Swedish architect and, from 1779, professor at the Royal Swedish Academy of Arts. He was appointed royal architect in 1799.

== Early life ==
He was the son of Samuel Tempelman (1711-1748), curate of Herrestad, and his wife Susanna Maria Ridderström (1718-1753). According to tradition, the name was derived from the Templars. The family had immigrated from Dorpat in Estonia, and had for generations lived in Östergötland. Susanna was the daughter of a captain and grew up in Östergötland. When Tempelman was three years old, his father died. He was cared for by his father's older brother, Peter Tempelman, who served as priest in the Östra Stenby congregation. His uncle was a man of scientific interest, who collected books and had contact with the Royal Swedish Academy of Sciences. Tempelman had a happy childhood and showed an early interest in design. His received his early education at home and continued studying, along with his cousin, at the high school in Linköping.

At Uppsala University in 1763, he began studying theology and the humanities while working as a tutor for income. But he eventually immersed himself in science, following in the likes of Carl Linnaeus, Anders Celsius, and Samuel Klingenstierna. Tempelman wrote a thesis in astronomy under Daniel Melanderhjelm before starting on a master's thesis in physics, De frictione corporum super plano horizontale motorum.

== Career ==
Carl Fredrik Adelcrantz succeeded Carl Johan Cronstedt as Superintendent of Antiquities in 1767, and two years later, he hired Tempelman. Adelcrantz hired Tempelman for his insight and skill, and took a personal interest in his development. While Tempelman wrote his master's thesis, he began work as an architect at the Superintendent's office. The thesis was elegantly illustrated and dedicated to Adelcrantz. He also continued to tutor and met the city architect Carl Henric König, one of the era's most skilled and high-profile architects as well as technically literate; he created drawings and descriptions for the inventor Christopher Polhem. This was the area that interested Tempelman.

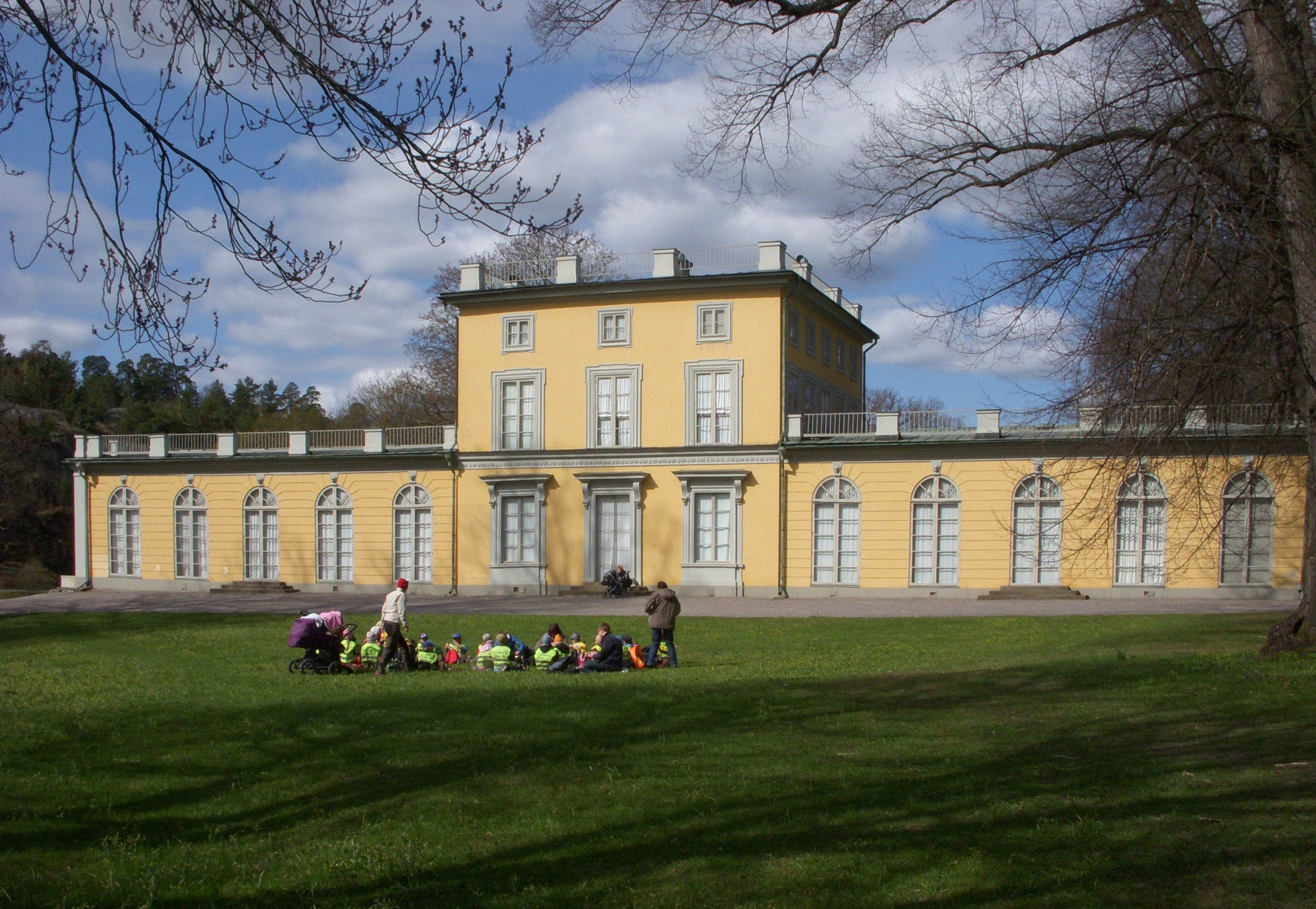
Gustav III Pavilion in Hagaparken, north of Stockholm.

In the spring of 1775, Adelcrantz sent Tempelman on a study trip to Copenhagen. In October 1776, Gustav III assigned Tempelman to be an information aide for fortifications; he trained under Fredrik Dederichs who taught prospective officers and architects since the 1750s, including Erik Palmstedt. Tempelman came to be involved in Gustav III's new opera house at Norrmalmstorg. It was a complex project and Adelcrantz appointed Tempelman to be responsible for project implementation. Tempelman designed Gustav III's Pavilion in with detailed instructions from the king. Many of Tempelman projects related to churches but there were also other public buildings. In addition, he undertook private commissions. Adelcrantz often made the first sketches, but the two men worked closely together.

Adelcrantz urged Tempelman to become a professor. In 1780, he was appointed professor at the Royal Swedish Academy of Arts. Tempelman traveled to Paris and Rome. He visited Naples with Carl August Ehrensvärd and they also made a trip to Pompeii and Vesuvius, returning home via Venice, Milan, Genoa, Antibes, Marseille, and Paris. The 1780s were a successful period of increasingly independent tasks, and, with international experience, he developed a more independent design. The 1790s were a politically unsettled time in Sweden. In July 1798, Tempelman complained that sight in one of his eyes was deteriorating. The office of the Superintendent of Antiquities, however, was still busy designing churches, schools, and hospitals, especially outside Stockholm, and this is where Tempelman gave significant effort. After suffering two serious illnesses within a year, his physical and emotional health deteriorated. He did not give up work entirely, continuing for several years at the office of the Superintendent of Antiquities, and also teaching at the academy.

== Personal life ==
Through his connections with Adelcrantz, Tempelman met Britta Elisabet Gyllenstam, daughter of Colonel Jonas Zacharias Gyllenstam and Catharina Elisabeth von Numers. They married in 1782. In the following year, they had a daughter, Mary Catherine, who died as an infant; his wife died a year later. Tempelman secondly married Dorothea Catherina Pagenkopff, the daughter of the German shoemaker Michael C. Pagenkopff, in 1804. They had five children, two boys who died early, and three girls. Tempelman died on 27 July 1816, and was buried in Stockholm, leaving behind his wife and three daughters.

== Partial list of works ==
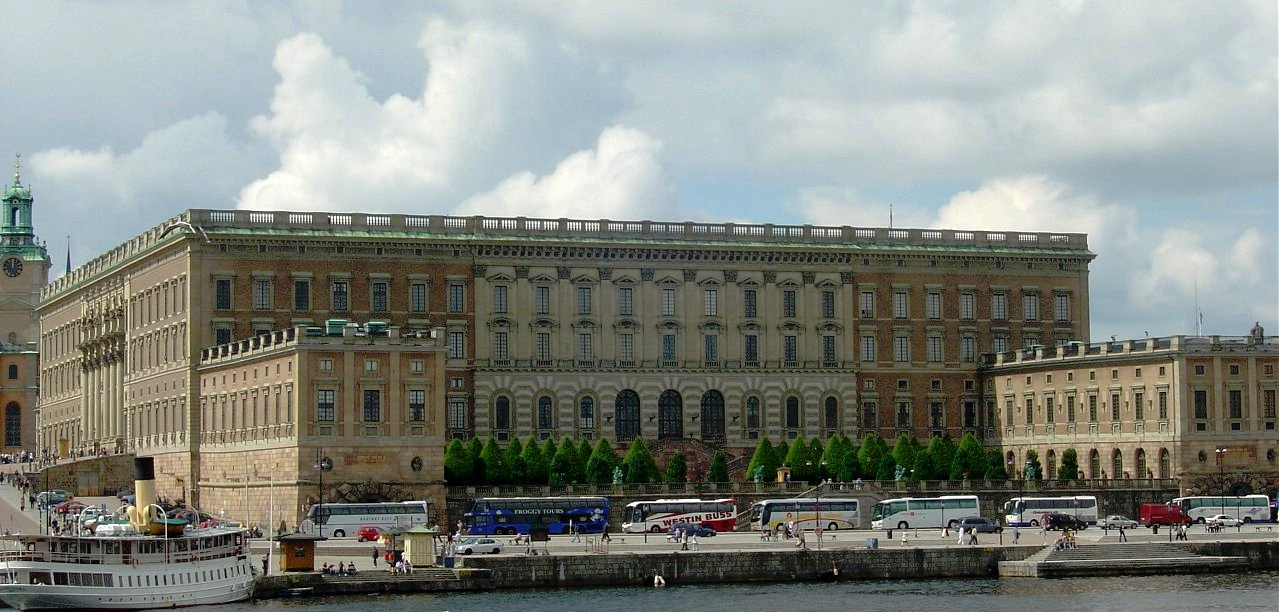
Royal Palace, Stockholm

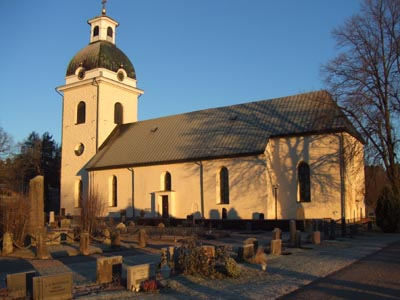
Valbo Church, Gästrikland

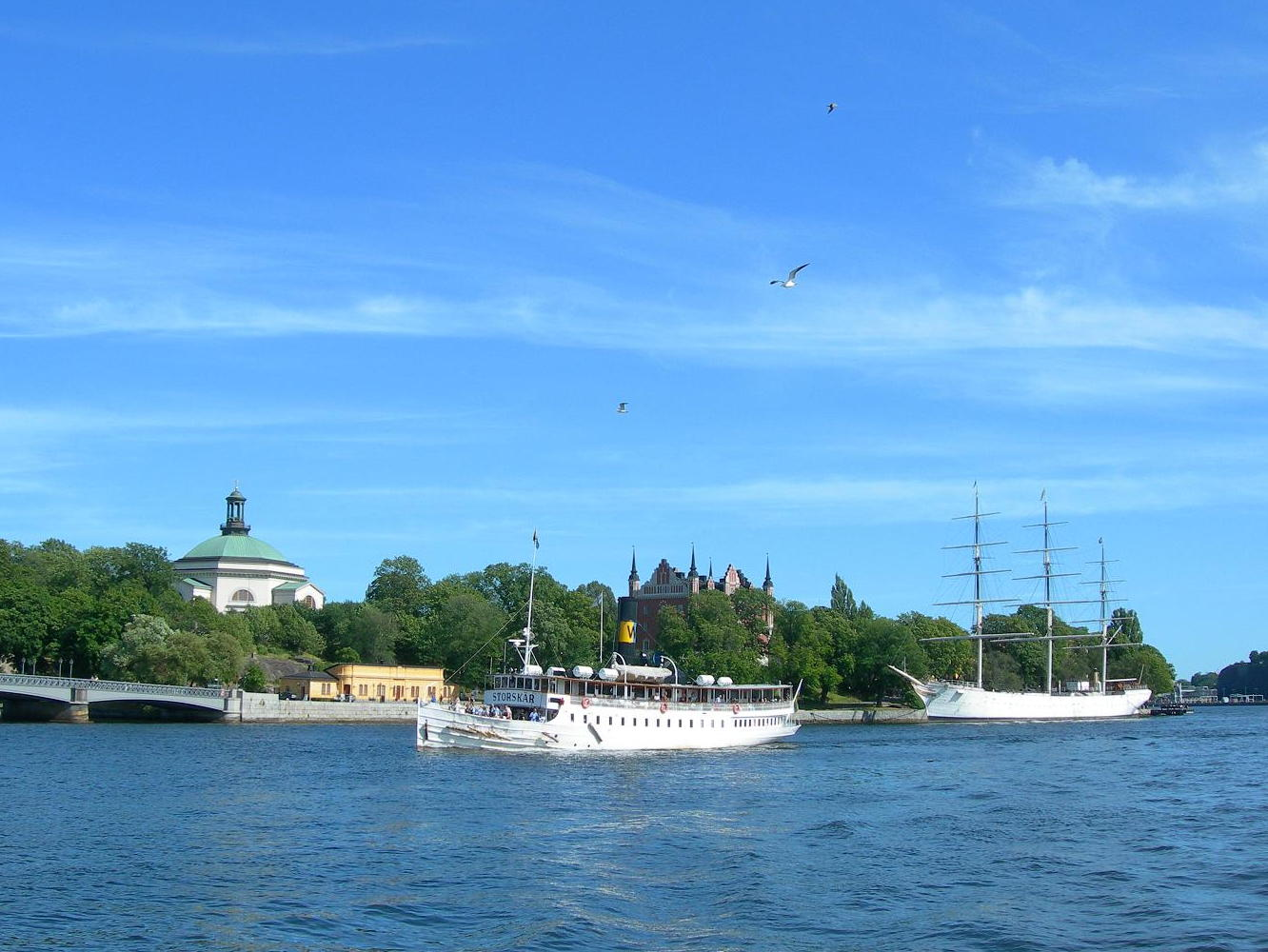
Skeppisholmen, Stockholm

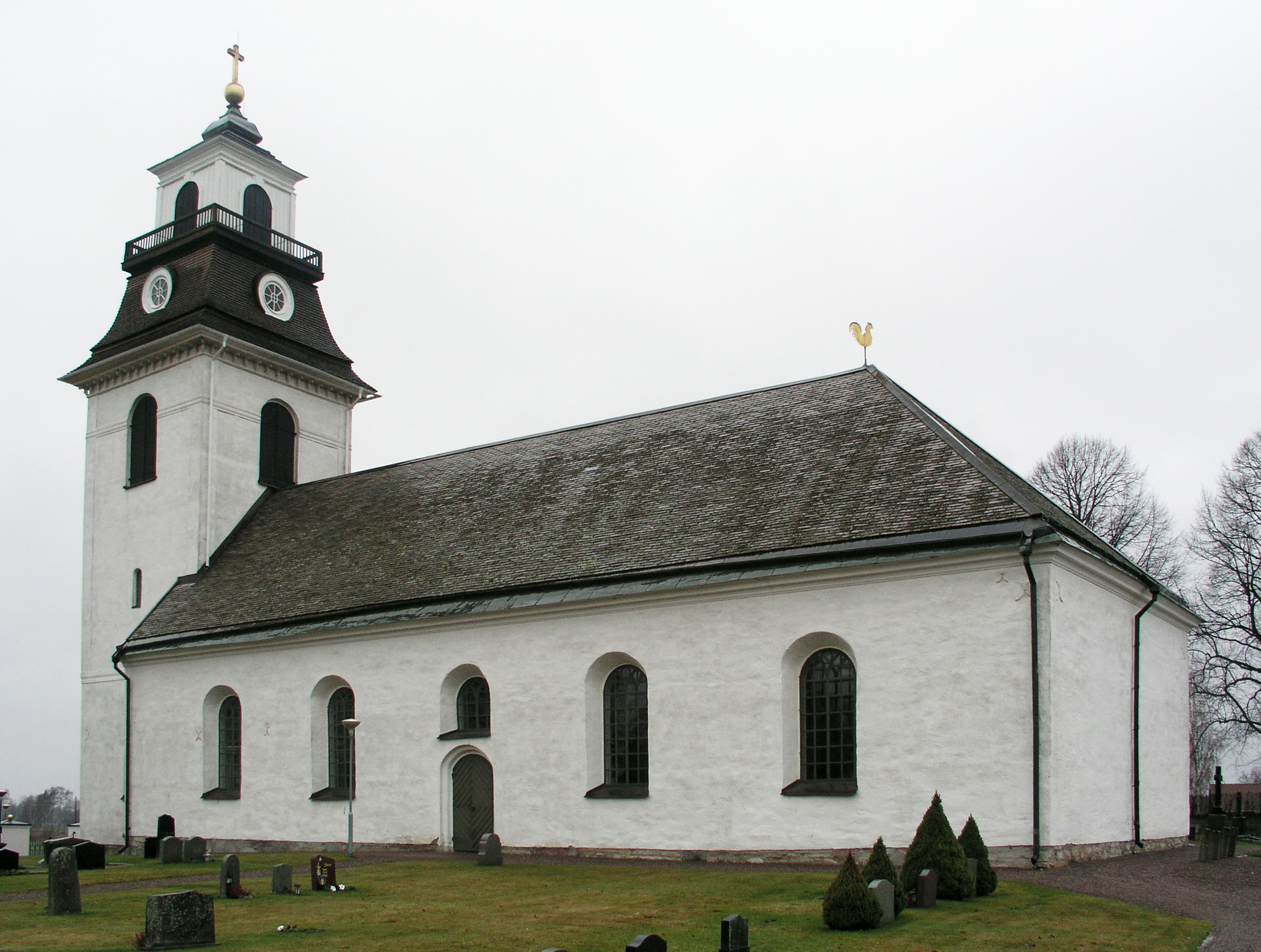
Rystads Church, Linköpings

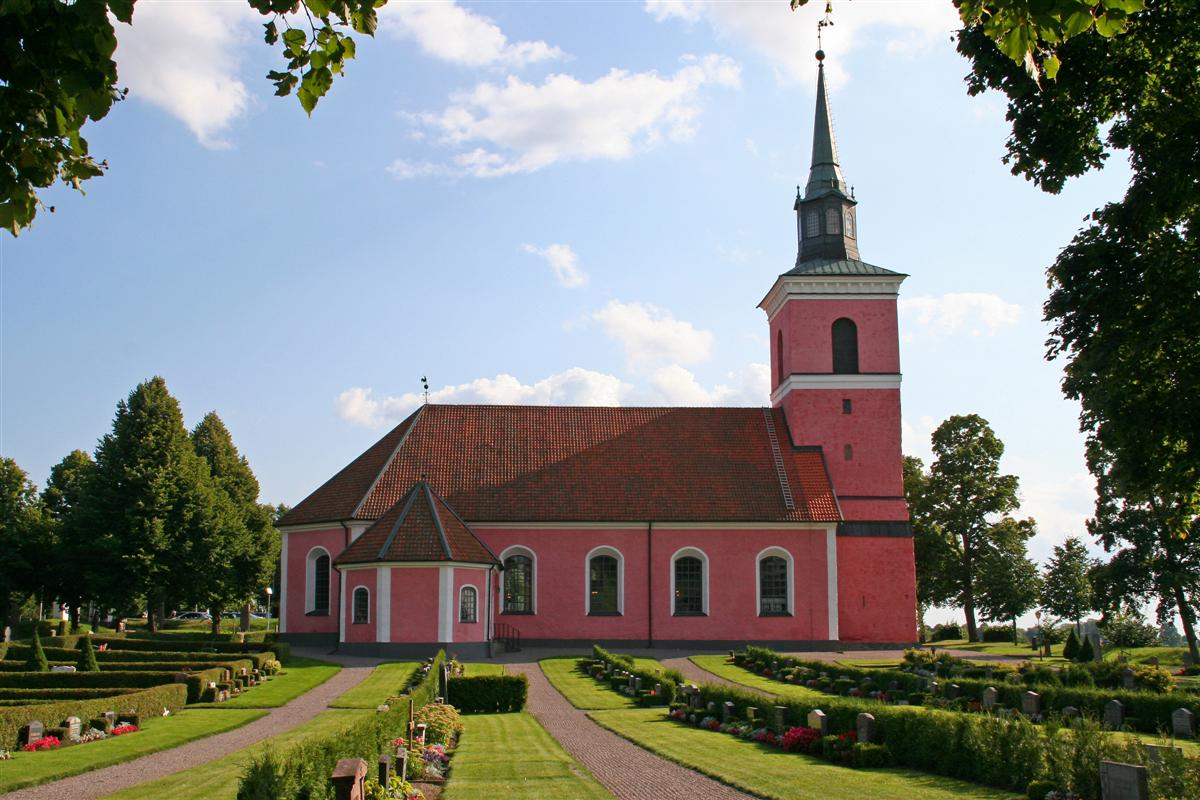
Slaka Church, Linköpings

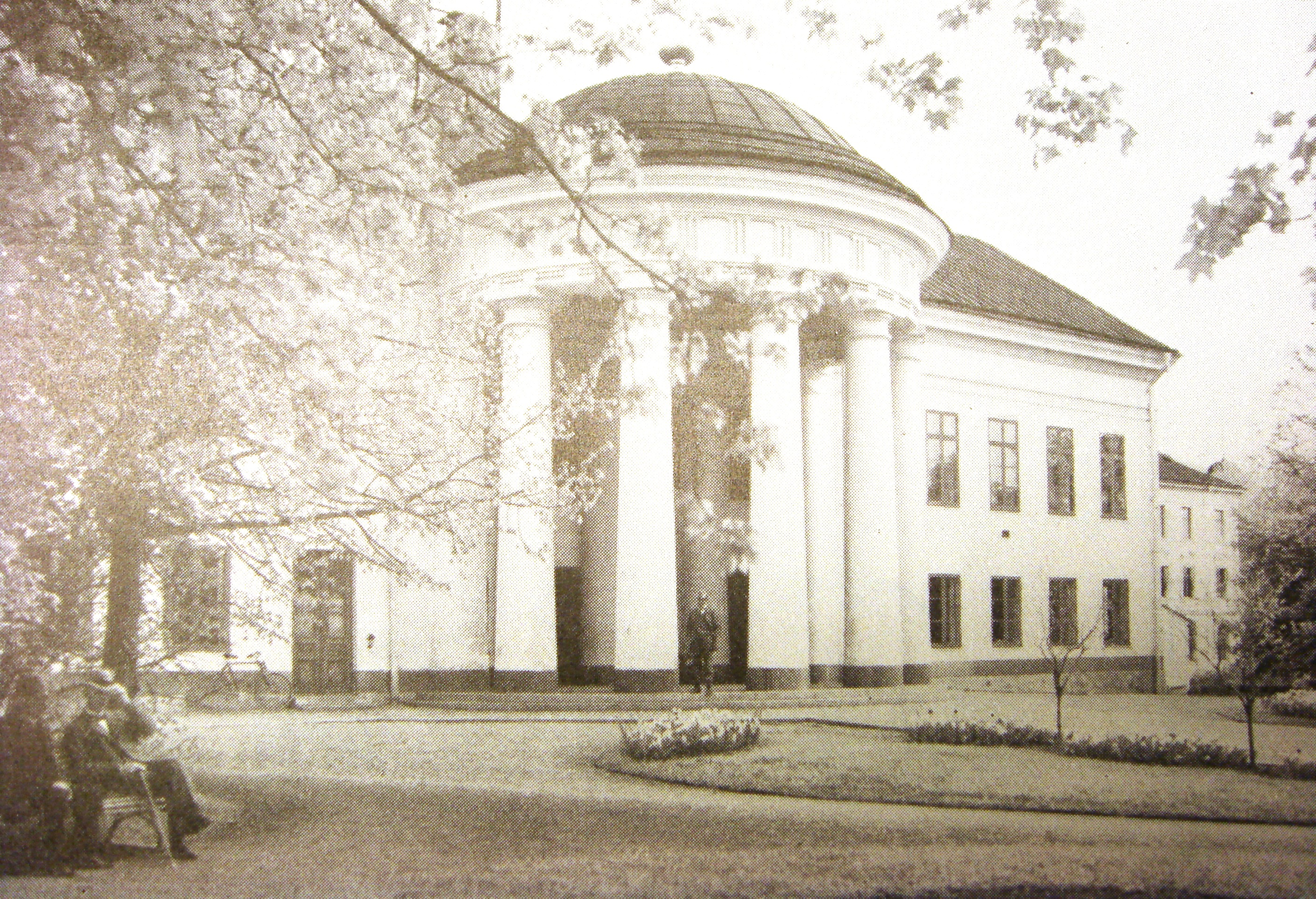
Härnösands gymnasium, in Härnösands

1. Old Town, Stockholm, castle environment, 1774
2. Royal Palace, rearranging the rooms & floors, 1774
3. Tranemo church, Västergötland, 1774, not done, 1600 Century church in the 1880s, replaced by new hexagonal church building was designed by architect Emil Victor Langlet
4. Ulriksdal, Uppland, north wing of the building's attic, 1774
5. Västerås gymnasium, Västmanland, restructuring proposals for Senate, 1774
6. Hycklinge Church, Ostrogothia, 1775, Per Wilhelm Palm Roth prepares new draft 1792
7. Göta Court of Appeal, Jonkoping, 1775
8. Valbo church, Gästrikland, tower and vestry, 1775, the tower was built in 1775
9. Nora Church, Västmanland, 1776, not performed, a new church built in the 1880s
10. Selångers church, Medelpad, 1776, erected in 1780-1781
11. Sollerö church, Dalarna, 1776
12. Sofia Magdalena Church, Askersund, school and almshouses, 1777
13. Björsäters church, Västergötland, 1777
14. Helsingborg, Corps-de-garde, 1777, building guards and jail completed in 1778, demolished 1882
15. Core Church, West Yorkshire, organ facade in 1777, destroyed by fire in 1893
16. Nässjö old church, Småland, 1777, erected in 1789-1791
17. Hornstull, city sports and customs houses, Stockholm, 1777, the archway demolished in 1905, customs houses demolished in 1933
18. Skeppsholmen, magazines, Stockholm, 1777 & 1779, rebuilt, now part of the Academy of Fine Arts
19. Tuna church, Medelpad, tower and nave, 1777, long house with a gable roof was built from 1776 to 1778, the tower was built until 1937
20. Uppsala Cathedral, Sture chancel, wrought iron grilles, 1777
21. Western Torups Church, Zealand, organ facade, 1777
22. Årstads courthouse, Halland, 1777, torn, probably 1973
23. Ödeshögs Church, West Yorkshire, 1777, rebuilt in the 1880s
24. Örkened Church, Zealand, 1777, erected in 1786-1788
25. Alvesta church, Småland, organ façade, 1778, built as proposed by Pehr Schiörlin
26. Stora Kopparberg church, Falun, tower and altar set-up, 1778, the tower built in 1780, transformative 1900, altar setup exchanged 1900
27. Kil's Church, wa, towers, 1778, was built in 1779-1780
28. Kläckeberga church, Smaland, altarpiece installation, 1778, not done
29. Linkoping, Stångebro, stone bridge, 1778, erected in 1779-1780, demolished for the construction of the Kinda Canal, new bridge for drawing 1870
30. Replots church, Ostrobothnia, Finland, 1778, erected in 1781, however, without a tower
31. Sollerö church, Dalarna, pulpit, 1778
32. Säters church, Dalarna, 1778, begun in 1780
33. Silvii school, Tun, Västergötland, 1778, built from 1780 to 1781, restored 1965
34. Värnamo church, Småland, organ façade, 1778, the organ was built in 1778, the church torn in the 1870s
35. Värö church, Halland, organ façade, 1778, the organ was demolished along with the church in 1855
36. Västerås dean farm, 1778, completed in 1780, a historic building in 1981
37. Fridlevstads church, Blekinge, towers, 1779, not performed
38. Hultsjö church, Småland, 1779, not done, plans for a new church of hoof-and city architect Per Axel Nyström 1859
39. Korsholm, Toby Bridge, Ostrobothnia, Finland, 1779, built in 1781, antiquarian protected 1982
40. Kättilstads Church, West Yorkshire, organ facade, 1779, revision of the proposal by Pehr Schiörlin, performed after the proposal
41. Gustaf Church, Lulea, SWE, 1779, conducted from 1787 to 1790, destroyed by fire in 1887
42. Rystads Church, West Yorkshire, in 1779, built in 1780-1783
43. Långholmen, Spinnhusbron, Stockholm, 1779, demolished
44. Tavastkyro church, Häme, Finland, 1779, erected in 1780-1782, first tower 1880
45. Bettna church, Södermanland, & chapel, 1780, unexecuted
46. Heinola residence, Häme, Finland, 1780, not built
47. Helgeandsholmen, Count Per's house and Lower Royal. Stallgården, Stockholm, 1780, executed around 1780, demolished 1893
48. Drottningholm, Ståthållarbostad & stables, Upland, 1781, completed in 1787 as a residence
49. North 's control, Stockholm, incl. plans to create a place for artists, sculptor and professor Johan Tobias Sergel konungastod, 1781
50. Börringe Church, Zealand, 1782, erected in 1783-1787, carnitine curved hood replaced by a pyramid-shaped in the 1870s
51. Drottningholm, the dukes' stables, Upland, 1782, converted into senior citizen housing in 1985, a historic building in 1987
52. Rystads Church, West Yorkshire, organ facade, 1782
53. Slack's Church, West Yorkshire, altar setup & organ facade, 1782
54. Vårdö church, Aland, Finland, 1782, the church later expanded during the 1780s, the tower was built in 1805
55. Turku Hospital, Finland Proper, 1782, built 1783-1784, demolished 1880
56. Arbrå church, Hälsingland, pulpit, 1783
57. Enåsa church and chapel, Västergötland, 1783
58. Hedensö manor, Södermanland, wing, 1783
59. Hökhuvuds Church, Upland, organ facade, 1783, organ building of Olof Schwan 1783, new organ works behind the old organ, 1936
60. St John's Church, Stockholm, 1783, not done
61. Skeppsholmen, Kungl. woodyard, Stockholm, 1783
62. Coins Hall, Stockholm, 1783
63. Ulriksdal, Upland, Confidence, 1783
64. Vissefjärda church, Småland, organ façade, 1783, organ building of Pehr Schiörlin 1784, replaced in 1883 by organ from Kalmar Cathedral
65. Consulates & post office, Helsingor, Denmark, 1784, was built in 1791
66. County residence of Härnösand, 1784
67. St. Peter's Church, Malmo, stands & organ facade, 1784
68. Siuntio Church, Nyland, organ façade, Finland, 1784, facade was built as drawn, organ replacement work
69. Söraby church, Småland, bleachers & organ façade, 1784, organ building of Pehr Schiörlin 1785, only the facade preserved
70. Al's church, Dalarna, pulpit, 1784, conducted from 1785 to 1787
71. Eastern Eds church, Smaland, altarpiece installation, 1784, carried out, but only altarpiece rescued by fire in 1958
72. Drottningholm, residential, Upland, 1785, not performed
73. Drottningholm castle stables, Upland, 1785, not performed
74. Drottningholm, ståthållarkansliet, Upland, 1785, was introduced in 1787
75. Gothenburg's Hospital, 1785, demolished 1963
76. Härnösand Gymnasium, Tennessee, 1785, monument 1982
77. Härnösand Hospital, Tennessee, 1785, ready 1788, a historic building in 1967
78. Jonsbergs Manor, West Yorkshire, Manor House, 1785, erected in 1791, a historic building in 1980
79. Vänersborgs church, Västergötland, 1785, only the facade preserved
80. Österåkers church, Södermanland, 1785
81. Dädesjö church, Småland, 1786, completed 1794
82. Haga, Upland, farm buildings, 1786, executed about 1786
83. Haga Castle, Uppland, 1786
84. Vähäkyrö church, Ostrobothnia, Finland, 1786, built in 1803
85. Church of Hämeenlinna, Häme, Finland, 1786, completed 1798
86. Uppsala University, auditoriums, 1786
87. Ölme church, Värmland, built in 1787-1788
88. Drottningholm Castle, Upland, bridges in the English Park, 1787
89. Haga, Upland, Corps-de-garde, building guard 1787
90. Haga, Upland, Gustav III 's Pavilion, 1787
91. Collegium medicum, Stockholm, 1787, probably carried
92. We Southern church, Småland, organ façade, 1787, the organ built by Per Schiörlin 1788
93. Uppsala University, Botanicum, 1787
94. S Church, Småland, 1788, was built 1830-1831 after a proposal by Per Axel Nyström 1828
95. Bodsjö church, Jamtland, 1788
96. Rinna's Church, West Yorkshire, in 1788, built in 1799-1802
97. Sollerö church, Dalarna, altar set-up, 1788
98. Western Karaby Church, Zealand, towers, 1788, not done, the tower was built in 1794 after another proposal, a new longhouse from drawings by architect Axel Almfelt 1822-1826
99. Växjö Bishop farm (Östrabo), Småland, 1788
100. Hohenwarth, farmhouse, Pomerania, Germany, 1789, demolished 1856
101. Crow Hults church, Småland, 1789, erected in 1801-1802
102. Forsmark church and chapel, Upland, 1790, erected in 1796-1802
103. Gothenburg hospital, a granary and brewery, 1790
104. Hällekis manor, Västergötland, farmhouse & barn, 1790, extension was built around 1790
105. Härkeberga Church, Upland, pulpit, 1790
106. Kvidinge Church, Zealand, towers, 1790
107. Linköping City Hall, West Yorkshire, 1790, not performed
108. Gustaf Church, Lulea, altar setup, 1790, carried out but the church destroyed by fire
109. The church, Southwest Finland, 1790, organ building of Olof Schwan 1791
110. Norsborgs manor, pavilion, 1790,
111. Sundby church, Södermanland, 1790
112. Vasteras Cathedral, Västmanland, epitaph, 1790
113. Christinae church, Alingsås, stands & organ facade, 1791
114. Härnösand Gymnasium, Tennessee, lectern, 1791
115. Falsterbo Light, Skåne, in 1792, built in 1793-1796, upper demolished 1842-1843, monument 1935
116. Färingtofta Church, Zealand, 1792
117. Trinity Church, Karlskrona, 1792, north portico finished first in 1862 after the Temple's proposal
118. Lindberg's Church, Halland, 1792, not done
119. Linköping Cathedral, tomb, 1792
120. Notte Appliances church, Småland, 1792, new church was built first in the 1830s after the drawing of the master mason John Abraham Wilelius
121. Ulrika Eleonora Church in Stockholm, front steps, 1792
122. Royal Palace in Stockholm, King Gustav IV Adolf floor, 1792
123. Tuna church, Småland, organ facade, 1792, at the rebuilding in the 1890s were preserved only Pehr Schiörlins organ works from 1795
124. Varberg's Church, Halland, 1792, the organ facade preserved but rebuilt and with sparser ornamentation
125. Fors Room Church, Smaland, altarpiece installation, 1793
126. Kuopio county, Savo, Finland, 1793, unexecuted
127. Ljung's Church, West Yorkshire, in 1793, built in 1796-1798
128. Church of Sund, Östergötland, altar setup & pulpit, 1793
129. Heinola hospital, Häme, Finland, 1794, was built in 1797-1799, now demolished
130. Jönköping Hospital, 1794, the hospital ended 1825
131. Karlskrona hospital, 1794
132. Nyköping Hospital, Saint Anne's Hospital in 1794, completed 1799
133. Nässjö old church, Småland, organ façade, 1794, processing of Pehr Schiörlins facade drawing from 1794
134. Vårdnäs Church, West Yorkshire, in 1794, long houses built from 1795 to 1797
135. Växjö Hospital, Småland, 1794, not performed
136. Växjö residence, Småland, wind decor & Fence, 1794
137. Grime's church, Halland, 1795, carried out, the tower, however, first during the 1900s
138. Holm's church, Medelpad, 1795, demolished in 1903, new construction in the Gothic Revival
139. King church of Sund, Östergötland, 1795
140. Rosersberg, Upland, 1795
141. Lind Hov Royal Farm, Halland, farmhouse & wings, 1796, grand pianos built in 1896, first farmhouse 1838
142. Lunda church, Södermanland, pulpit, 1796
143. Stockholm Observatory, 1796
144. Vreta Abbey Church, Östergötland, gravestone, 1796
145. But are Church, Upland, 1797, built 1797-1806
146. Stora Tuna Church, Dalarna, organ façade, 1797, organ building in 1800, fire damage, 1807, new organ, 1969
147. Oulu Hospital, Ostrobothnia, Finland, 1797, not performed
148. Västerås Hospital, Västmanland, 1797, the buildings demolished in the 1880s
149. Dädesjö church, Småland, bleachers, 1798
150. Gryts church, Södermanland, stands & organ façade, 1798, unexecuted
151. Linköping gymnasium, 1799, new trivial school built in 1828-1830
152. Kälviä church, Ostrobothnia, Finland, bell tower and parish magazine, 1799, was built in 1803-1804
153. Vaxholm Church, Upland, 1799, the church consecrated in 1803, the tower is not built
154. Eastern Husby Church, West Yorkshire, 1799
155. Karstula chapel church, Ostrobothnia, Finland, 1800
156. Stockholm Smedjegård custody, 1800
157. Strängnäs Cathedral, Södermanland, organ facade, 1800
158. Tubbetorps property, Västergötland, farmhouse, 1800, probably done around 1800, new residential building built in 1803-1804
159. Sleeping Valla's Church, West Yorkshire, 1800, not performed, built and designed by Samuel Enander 1816
160. Matteröds Church, Zealand, 1802, new tower 1897-1898
161. Brännkyrka Church, Stockholm, 1802
162. Vreta Abbey Church, Östergötland, tomb, 1802, not done
163. Fittja bridge, SWE, 1803, built 1813, torn at the beginning of the 1900s
164. Kalmar gymnasium, Småland, 1803
165. Leppävirta Church, Savo, Finland, in 1803, erected, but burned in 1834, the new church after the drawing of the architect Carl Ludvig Engel 1846
166. Rolf's church, Halland, 1803, revised in 1816 by conductor and Lieutenant Pehr Wilhelm Palmroth, towers erected in the 1920s
167. Skedevi Church, Missouri, 1803, transept my windows bricked up during the 1900s
168. Bötoms church, Ostrobothnia, 1804, erected in 1808-1811
169. Jämshög church, Blekinge, 1804, erected in 1804-1833
170. Vaxholm Church, Upland, organ facade, 1804
171. Pori School, Vaasa, Finland, 1804, the outbreak of war interrupted the building, burned again in the great fire of 1852
172. Hammar Lunda Church, Zealand, stands & organ façade, 1805, executed in a somewhat simplified condition of the organ is only the facade preserved
173. Herrevadskloster, Scania, demesne, 1805, not performed
174. Frederick Church, Karlskrona, Blekinge, tornhuvar, 1805, not performed
175. Norrtälje church, Upland, Altar, 1805
176. Säters church, Dalarna, towers, 1805, the tower damaged by fire in 1803, after a new drawing of Tempelman repaired 1806
177. Vaksala Church, Upland, stands & organ façade, 1805, Organ building after drawing of Olof Schwan, facade and some original parts preserved
178. Bjorn Borg's town hall, Vaasa, Finland, 1806, started in 1807, after the war broke new drawings in 1839, destroyed in the fire of 1852
179. District Hammar's Church, West Yorkshire, altar set-up, 1806
180. Karbennings Church, Västmanland, 1806, not done, a new church in 1845
181. Kristdala church, Småland, bleachers & organ facade, 1806
182. Marstrand's Church, Bohuslän, bleachers & organ façade, 1806, not performed
183. Säters church, Dalarna, altar pulpit, 1806
184. S Church, Jamtland, organ facade, 1807
185. Erajärvi chapel church, Häme?, Finland, 1807, built in 1821
186. Fagerhults church, Småland, gallery, 1807, probably made, the church torn in the 1890s
187. Gothenburg Cathedral, tomb, 1807
188. Harlösa Church, Zealand, stands & organ façade, 1807, carried out, replaced with new organ
189. Härnösand Gymnasium, Tennessee, entrance gate, 1807, fences & gates, erected in 1810
190. Sala Church, Västmanland, towers, 1807, none of the proposals made
191. Stockholm, Nytorget, Skånegatan 83, residential, 1807, demolished 1930
192. Västra Husby Church, West Yorkshire, 1807, erected after a simplified drawing of Axel Almfelt 1816, burned 1977, rebuilt
193. Oved's Church, Zealand, stands & organ facade, 1807
194. Crow Hults church, Småland, organ façade, 1808, processing of Pehr Schiörlins proposal in 1807, organ construction with simplified facade of Schiörlin 1810-1811
195. Norrsunda Church, Upland, organ facade, 1808, executed, new organ built in 1963
196. Eastern Husby Church, West Yorkshire, pulpit, 1808
197. Botkyrka church, Södermanland, bleachers & organ facade, 1810
198. Säters church, Dalarna, bleachers & organ facade, 1811
199. Vadstena school, West Yorkshire, 1811, medieval schoolhouse torn down in 1810, a new schoolhouse for other drawings, built first in 1831
200. Caroli cemetery, Borås, Västergötland, 1812
201. Hörups Church, Zealand, organ facade, undated, probably not done
202. Sjöö Castle, Uppland, the measurement of Tessin the Elder terrace & stairs, undated
