= Morton Baum =

Morton Baum may refer to:

- Morton J. Baum (1897–1963), American businessman, president of Hickey Freeman
- Morton Baum (lawyer) (1905–1968), American lawyer, chairman of New York City Center
