= Hickey Freeman =

American suit manufacturer

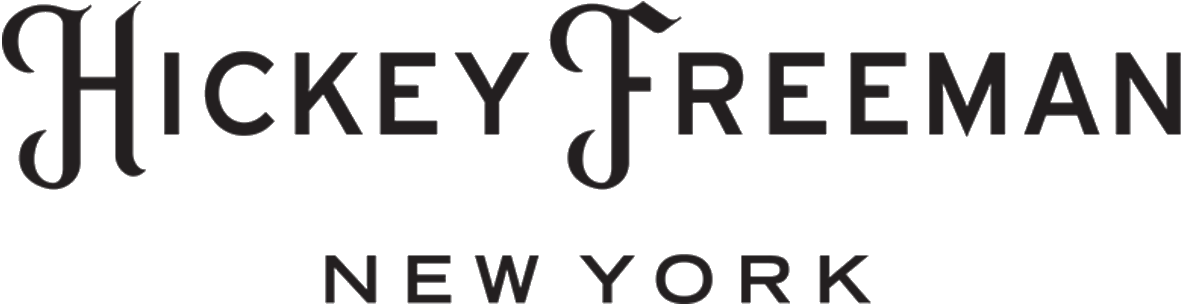

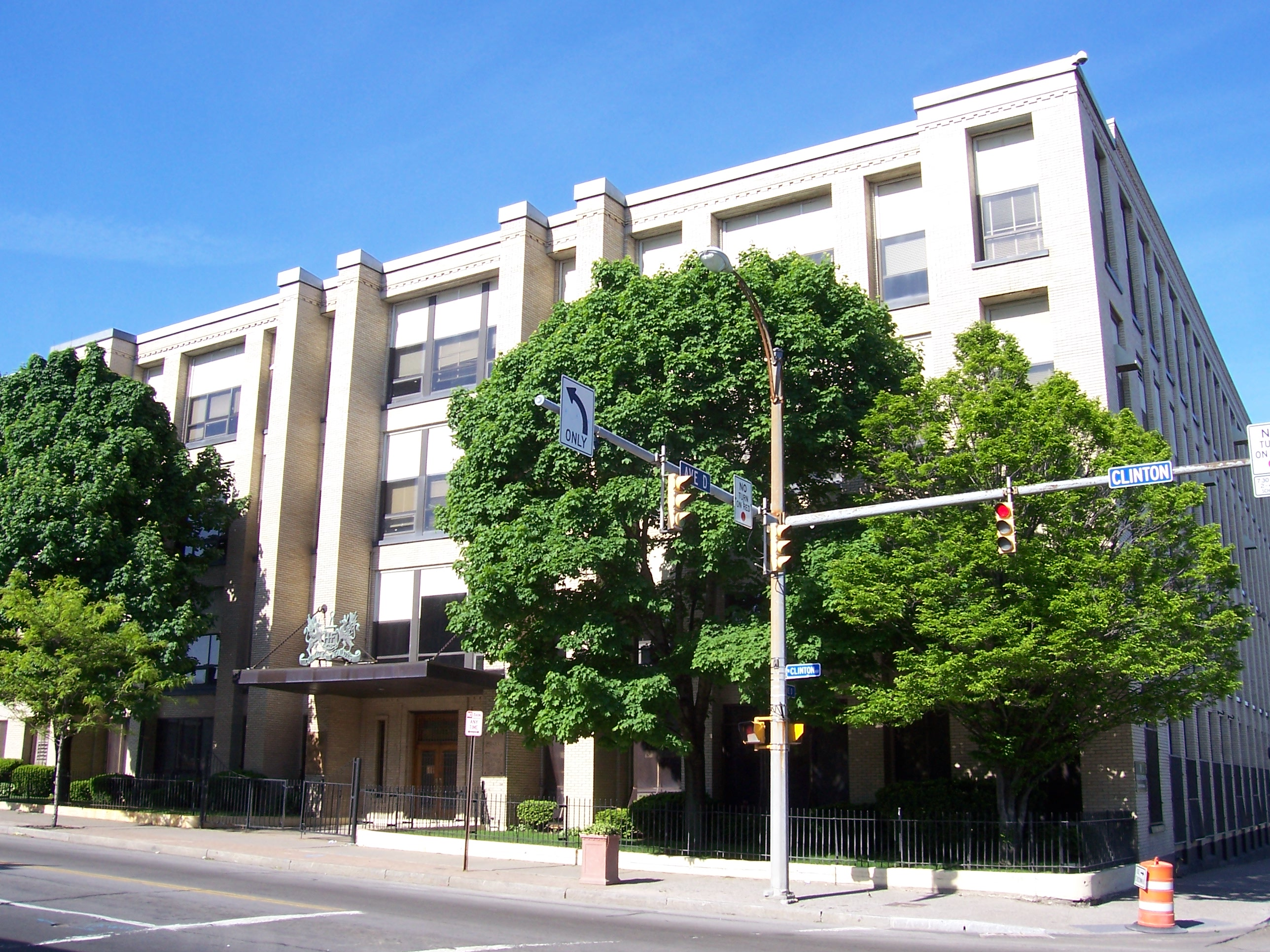
- Manufacturing facility in Rochester, New York
- Industry: Clothing
- Founded: 1899; 127 years ago
- Founder: Jeremiah G. Hickey
- Headquarters: Rochester, New York
- Key people: List: Emmett Baum (Vice-President, 1908) Morton J. Baum (President, 1959-1963) Walter B. D. Hickey(President, 1963-1976) Walter B. D. "Duffy" Hickey, Jr.(President, 1976-1984) Gasper Tirone(President, 1984-1988) Homi Patel (President, 1988-1992) Steven Weiner(President, 1992-1998) Paulette Garafalo(President, 1998-2008) Stephen Granovsky(President, 2008-Present)
- Products: Suits
- Website: hickeyfreeman.com

Hickey Freeman is a manufacturer of suits for men and boys, which was founded in Rochester, New York, US, in 1899, and operated a factory there from 1908 until 2023. In 2023, ownership of the brand name and the historic factory diverged, with production of Hickey-Freeman branded clothing, currently owned by Authentic Brands Group, being moved to Mexican facilities operated by Peerless Clothing.

The factory in Rochester was sold to the Tom James Company, owners of the similar but distinct "H. Freeman" brand. The factory operations were renamed Rochester Tailoring Company, and continue to produce suiting under that name and for a number of contracts, including for the US Military and the clothing company Epaulet.

== History ==
During the 1880s and 1890s, Jeremiah G. Hickey (1866–1960) was a bookkeeper for Wile, Brickner & Wile, then the largest manufacturer of men's clothing in Rochester. His close friend Jacob L. Freeman (died 1925) was a private contractor of the firm. Together with fellow Wile, Brickner & Wile employees Thomas Mahon and George A. Brayer, they formed Hickey, Freeman, & Mahon Co. in 1899. Since Jeremiah ("Jerry") Hickey contributed the most capital, and Mahon made no original investment, the name was changed in 1900 to the Hickey-Freeman Co.

In 1902, the company was able to take over the business and the larger premises of Michael Kolb & Co. Hickey-Freeman grew even more, and in 1908 it merged with Beckel, Baum & Leopold Co., retaining the Hickey-Freeman name. The president of Beckel, Baum & Leopold Co. was Emmett Baum, who became vice-president of Hickey-Freeman Co. after the merger. Baum was largely responsible for Hickey-Freeman's decision in 1908 to manufacture only high quality clothing. At that time, ready-to-wear suits were seldom made with hand-craftsmanship of any quality, but Hickey-Freeman recognized the importance of quality in the manufacture of men's clothing.

By 1912, Hickey-Freeman Co. had amassed enough capital and business to build a larger, more modern factory on N. Clinton Ave. on the city's northern outskirts. Known as The Temple, this location was chosen in order to retain the company's skilled workers, after a survey showed that a majority of the company's employees lived within walking distance of this area. Although the new factory was one of the most complete facilities of its kind in the country, it became necessary for Hickey-Freeman to add space to the building twice more during the 1920s, to accommodate the company's increased volume and over 1,700 employees.

The Hartmarx Corporation bought the company in 1964.

In 2004, the factory underwent extensive renovations, funded in part by $4 million in state taxpayer money and $1 million from Rochester city taxpayers.

Hartmarx went bankrupt in the US in 2009 and their assets were acquired n August 2009 by Emerisque Brands UK and its partner SKNL North America and moved into the HMX holding company. In 2012, Authentic Brands Group, an intellectual property corporation with a mandate to acquire, manage and build long-term value in prominent consumer brands, purchased HMX, including Hickey Freeman.

In 2013, Grano Retail Investments Inc., also owner of luxury tailored menswear brand Samuelsohn Ltd., acquired the tangible assets of Hickey Freeman including the Rochester factory, and a forty-year license to the Hickey-Freeman brand name.

In 2020, amid the COVID-19 pandemic, Hickey Freeman shifted its production to manufacture masks and other personal protective equipment for doctors and medical workers.

On May 18, 2023, it was announced that the manufacturing of Hickey Freeman branded suits would be moved to Mexico with design and production contracted to Peerless Clothing.

The Rochester factory continued to make clothing for other brands, so all workers were able to keep their jobs. The factory also announced plans rebrand as "Rochester Tailored Clothing", and will be opening a retail store in Rochester. The Tom James Co. purchased the former Hickey Freeman factory in 2023.

== Presidents ==
Presidents/CEOs
Name	Tenure
Jeremiah G. Hickey	1899–1959
Morton J. Baum	1959–1963
Walter B. D. Hickey Sr.	1963–1976
Walter B. D. "Duffy" Hickey Jr.	1976–1984
Gasper Tirone	1982–1991
Homi Patel (Hartmarx Corp)	1988–1992
Steven Weiner	1992–1998
Paulette Garafalo	1998–2008
Stephen Granovsky (Grano Retail Investments)	2013–2023

== See also ==
- Oxxford Clothes
- Brooks Brothers
- J. Press
- Hartmarx
- Paul Stuart
