= Morton J. Baum =

American businessman

Morton Jacob Baum (October 27, 1897 – August 1, 1963) was an American businessman. He was president of the Hickey Freeman from 1959 until his death. He began working for Hickey Freeman in 1919. He was elected the second president of Hickey Freeman in 60 years.

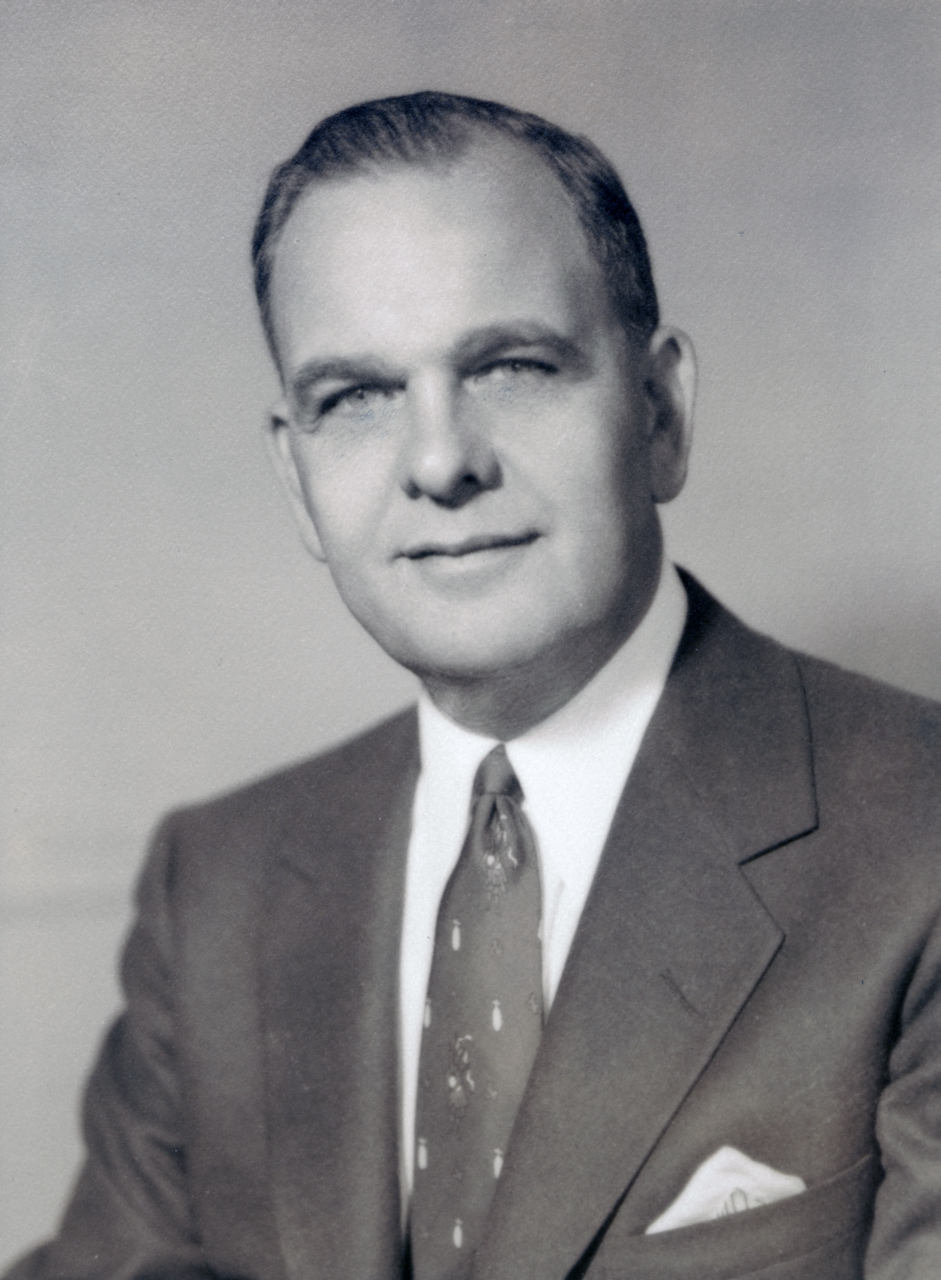
Morton J Baum

== Biography ==
Baum was born in Philadelphia. He was the son of Emmett Baum. He was elected to Phi Beta Kappa as his graduation from the University of Pennsylvania. He joined the Navy shortly after graduating. His father Emmett was the president of turn-of-the-century clothing manufacturers Beckel, Baum & Leopold Co. which bought Hickey Freeman in 1908.

He married Margaret Hays September 5, 1922 in Rochester, New York. They had two children, Helen Baum Oakes and Morton J Baum Jr. (April 28, 1926).

During World War II, he made more than 50 trips to Washington as chief of the men's and boys' apparel division of the War Production Board. In 1951, he was chief of the men's apparel section of the Office of Price Stabilization.

He successfully negotiated the collective bargaining agreement between the clothing industry and the Amalgamated Clothing workers of America.

He had been elected president of Hickey-Freeman in December 1959 at which time Jeremiah Hickey became chairman. Baum had been president of the Clothing Manufacturers Association (CMA), the national organization, from 1952 until 1959. His most recent activity in this area involved leading the negotiations for the three-year labor contract signed earlier in the year. He was a tough bargainer but always gentle and soft-spoken. Jacob Petofsky and the executives of the union send letter of sympathy to Mrs. Baum in which they said: "We, are shocked and deeply saddened at the passing of your husband. He was not only an outstanding leader of the clothing industry but a distinguished American whose ability, vision and courage let distinction to everything he undertook. He has left an enviable mark in business, government, education, and public service. We, in the Amalgamated, are proud of our years of association with him. We, shall miss his goodness and graciousness"

He was on the board of Genesee Hospital, Baden Street Settlement, Harley School, Sidney Hillman Health Center, and Brandeis University.

Baum died at Genesee Hospital in Rochester.

== Publications ==
- Baum, Morton J. (1951), "Maturity in Industrial Relations: A Case Study", Industrial and Labor Relations Review, vol. 4, no. 2, Ithaca, New York: Cornell University School of Industrial and Labor Relations, pp. 257–264, doi:10.1177/001979395100400208, ISSN 0019-7939, JSTOR 2519234, S2CID 155065216

Business positions
Preceded by Jeremiah G. Hickey	President of Hickey Freeman Co. 1959–1963	Succeeded by Walter B. D. Hickey
