= Oswego Yacht Club =

- Burgee
- Short name: OYC
- Founded: 1881
- Location: 30 Lake St., Oswego, New York 13126
- Website: oswegoyachtclub.org

Oswego Yacht Club is a yacht club, established in 1881, located in Oswego, New York.

== Clubhouses ==
- Oswego Yacht Club
- U.S. National Register of Historic Places
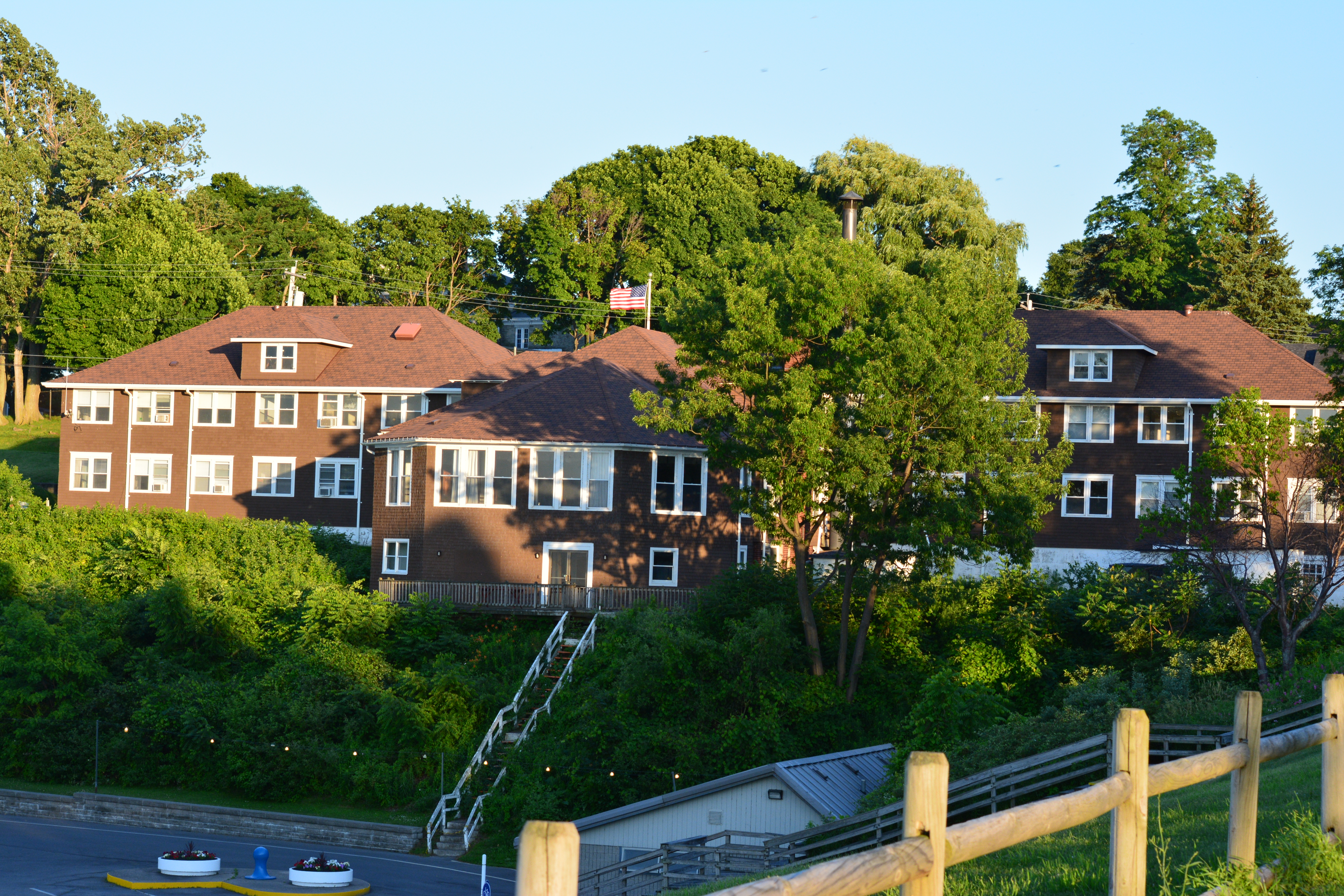

- Location within New York Location within the United States
- Location: 41 Lake St., Oswego, New York
- Coordinates: 43°27′43.93″N 76°31′16.32″W
- Area: 2.7 acres (1.1 ha)
- Built: 1914
- Architectural style: Arts and Crafts
- NRHP reference No.: 10000105
- Added to NRHP: March 23, 2010

The first clubhouse was erected on the shores of Lake Ontario in 1883. Eventually more space was needed and OYC built a new clubhouse in 1919, the facility now known as the McCrobie Civic Center and for a time as the Naval Militia Building, a historic clubhouse building located at Oswego in Oswego County, New York. It was built in two phases; the center section was begun in 1914 and completed in 1919 as the yacht club. The east and west wings were added in 1949-50 by New York State when the building was occupied as the New York State Naval Militia Armory and U.S. Naval Reserve Training Center. The original section is a one-story Arts and Crafts style building with a walk out basement in the rear and Colonial Revival features. It was designed by noted Rochester architect Claude Fayette Bragdon (1866-1946). It is essentially a rectangular building with a hipped roof. It features a five sided room in the back with a five faceted hipped roof. The wings are two story structures measuring 70.4 feet by 40.4 feet. The city of Oswego acquired the building in 1978 for $50,000 and it is used as a municipal and recreation center.

It was listed on the National Register of Historic Places in 2010.

In 2005, OYC moved to its present location at 19 Lake St, at the Oswego International Marina.
