= First Universalist Church (Rochester, New York) =

Historic church in New York, United States

- U.S. National Register of Historic Places
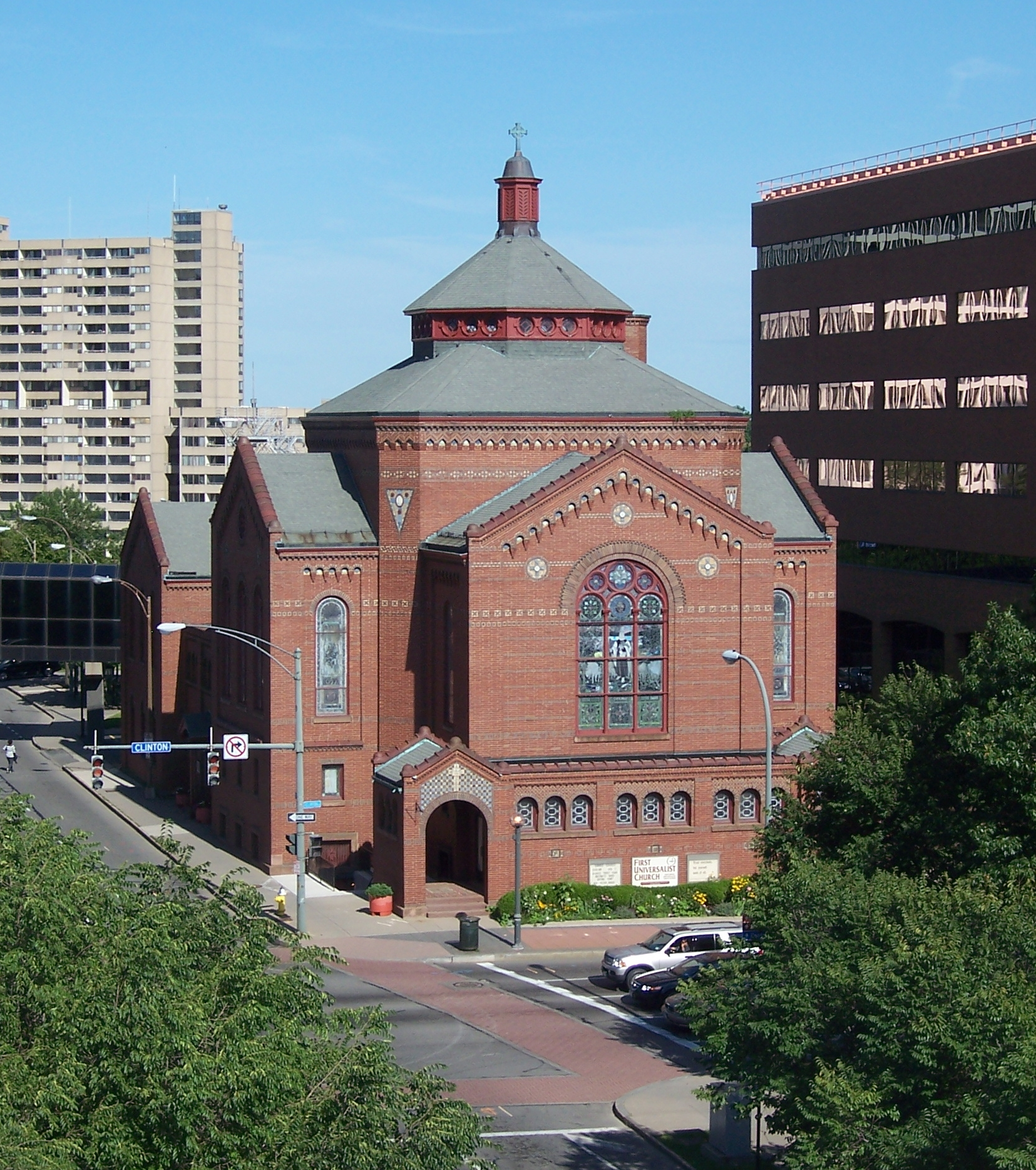
- First Universalist Church, August 2008

- Location within New York Location within the United States
- Location: SE corner of S. Clinton Ave. and Court St., Rochester, New York
- Coordinates: 43°9′14″N 77°36′17″W
- Area: less than one acre
- Built: 1907-1908
- Architect: Bragdon, Claude Fayette
- MPS: Inner Loop MRA
- NRHP reference No.: 71000545
- Added to NRHP: May 27, 1971

The First Universalist Church is a historic Universalist church building located at 150 S. Clinton Ave. in Rochester, New York. Construction began in September 1907 and was dedicated in October 1908. First Universalist Church is affiliated with the Unitarian Universalist Association and is one of two Unitarian Universalist congregations in Monroe County, New York; the other being the First Unitarian Church of Rochester.

== Congregation, beliefs, and programs ==
The church conducts one weekly worship service on Sundays, virtually from March 2020 to November 2021 due to the COVID-19 pandemic. In November 2021 they began hybrid worship services, with an online service (via Zoom) happening simultaneously with an in-person service in the building.

The church is diverse and inclusive, having, in the words of its web site, "no shared creed. Our shared covenant (our Seven Principles) supports “the free and responsible search for truth and meaning.” Though Unitarianism and Universalism were both liberal Christian traditions, some of us embrace diverse teachings from other faiths, hold humanist beliefs, or call ourselves atheists".

The church's mission statement is: "to nurture the spirit, and serve the community".

First Universalist ministers to their congregation, and the external community through a variety of active committees and teams such as:

- The Board of Trustees

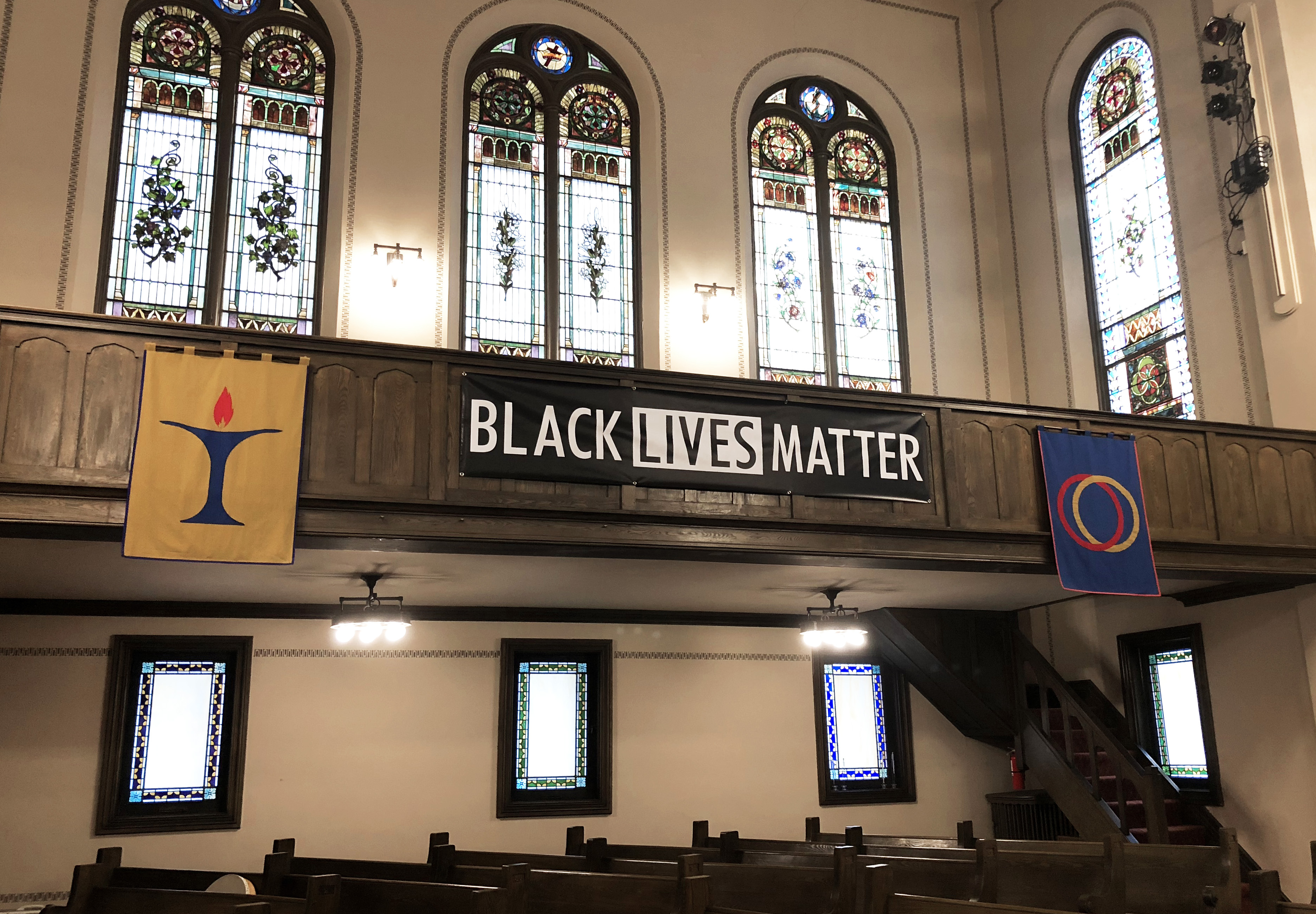
The indoor Black Lives Matter Banner at First Universalist Church of Rochester, hung in March 2019.

- Caring Committee
- Communications Committee
- Finance Committee
- House Committee
- Lifespan Faith Development
- Membership Committee
- Committee on Ministry
- Music Committee
- Nominating Committee
- Personnel Committee
- Faith In Action Council (FIAC)
- Social Justice Project Teams(AKA "Social Justice Circles")
- Worship Committee
- COVID Task Force

First Universalist is a Welcoming Congregation, and is recognized as such by the Unitarian Universalist Association.

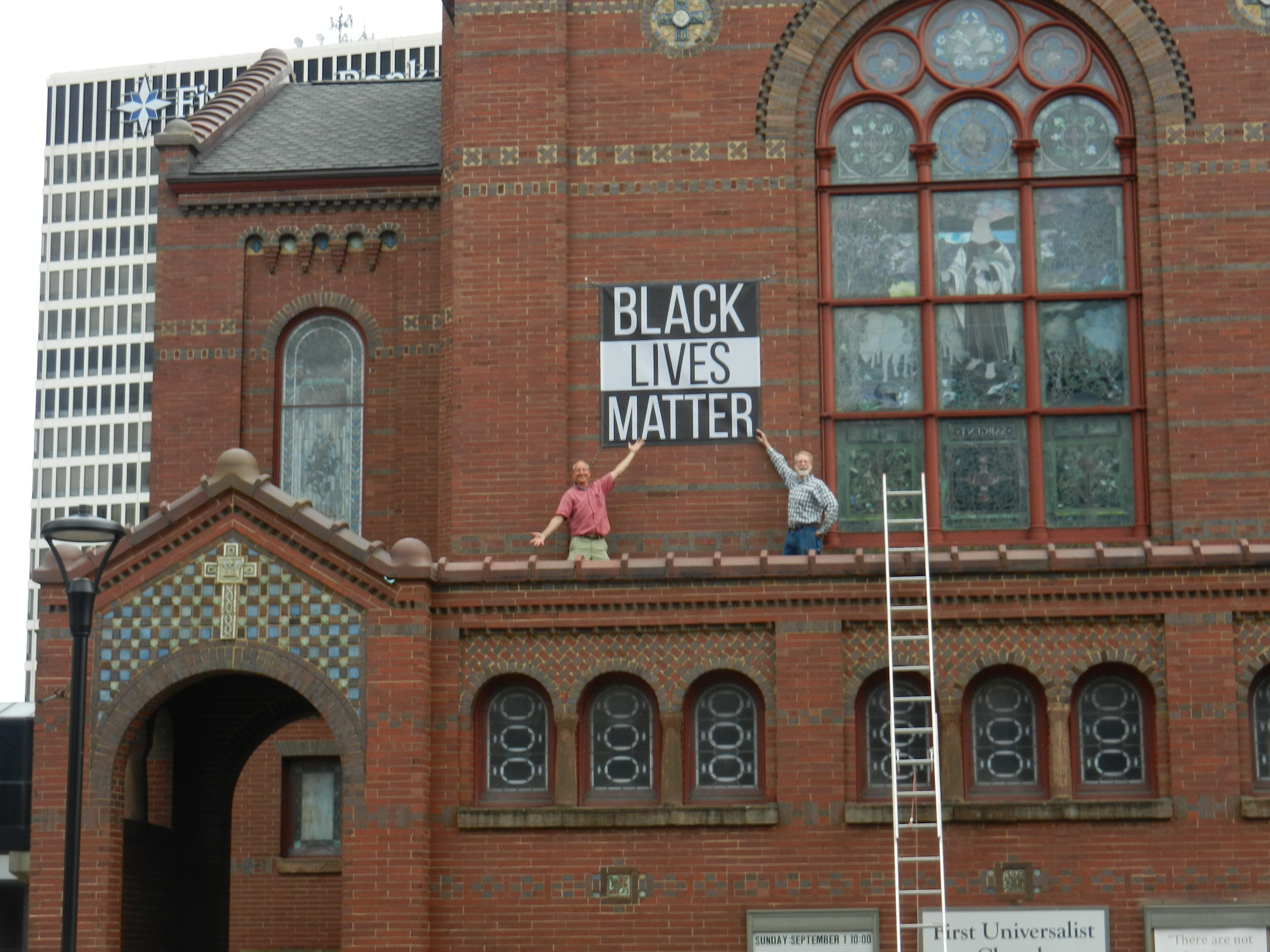
Hanging of the outdoor Black Lives Matter banner on 9/1/19.

First Universalist releases a small digital weekly email concerning church events. They also have monthly newsletter, titled "Our Outlook", that is published on their website as well as sent out physically. Archives of both these publications, along with archives of past sermons and annual reports, can be found on their website.

== Black Lives Matter ==
During the summer of 2020, First Universalist congregation members supported local Black Lives Matter protests both before and after the news of Daniel Prude's death at the hands of the Rochester Police Department was made public. Initially they hosted a table of supplies and made the church restroom available. As the protests lasted into the fall of 2020, First Universalist began hosting the Rochester Street Medic Collective.

The medics were hosted in the Clara Barton lounge area of the building, off the parking lot. The medics used this site as a home base for storing supplies and an ad hoc site for medical treatment. Water, food, and other supplies were still being distributed to protestors and medics by church members at this time.

== LGBTQ+ ==
=== Trans Naming Ceremony ===
In December of 2024 First Universalist, First Unitarian Church of Rochester, and UU Canandaigua had a joint "Trans Naming Ceremony" event, hosted by First Unitarian in their building. This event included a spiritual naming ceremony, as is done with welcoming new children into UU faith communities, as well as an LGBTQ+ fair. There was also several workshops on legally changing your name in government IDs, etc, as well as lawyers present to help with legal questions around the matter. It was well attended and there is talk of making it an annual event.

=== Big Gay Wedding ===
In January 2025 First Universalist, First Unitarian, and UU Canandaigua had another joint event, a "Big Gay Wedding", this time at the First Universalist church building. This event was to welcome any couple, especially queer ones, who wanted to be legally married before the second Trump administration took control of the government. Many local businesses donated their time and products, such as floral arrangements, cake, and photographers. Ministers from all three churches performed public ceremonies in the sanctuary of First Universalist and private ones up in the minister's office, for those wanting a more intimate ceremony.

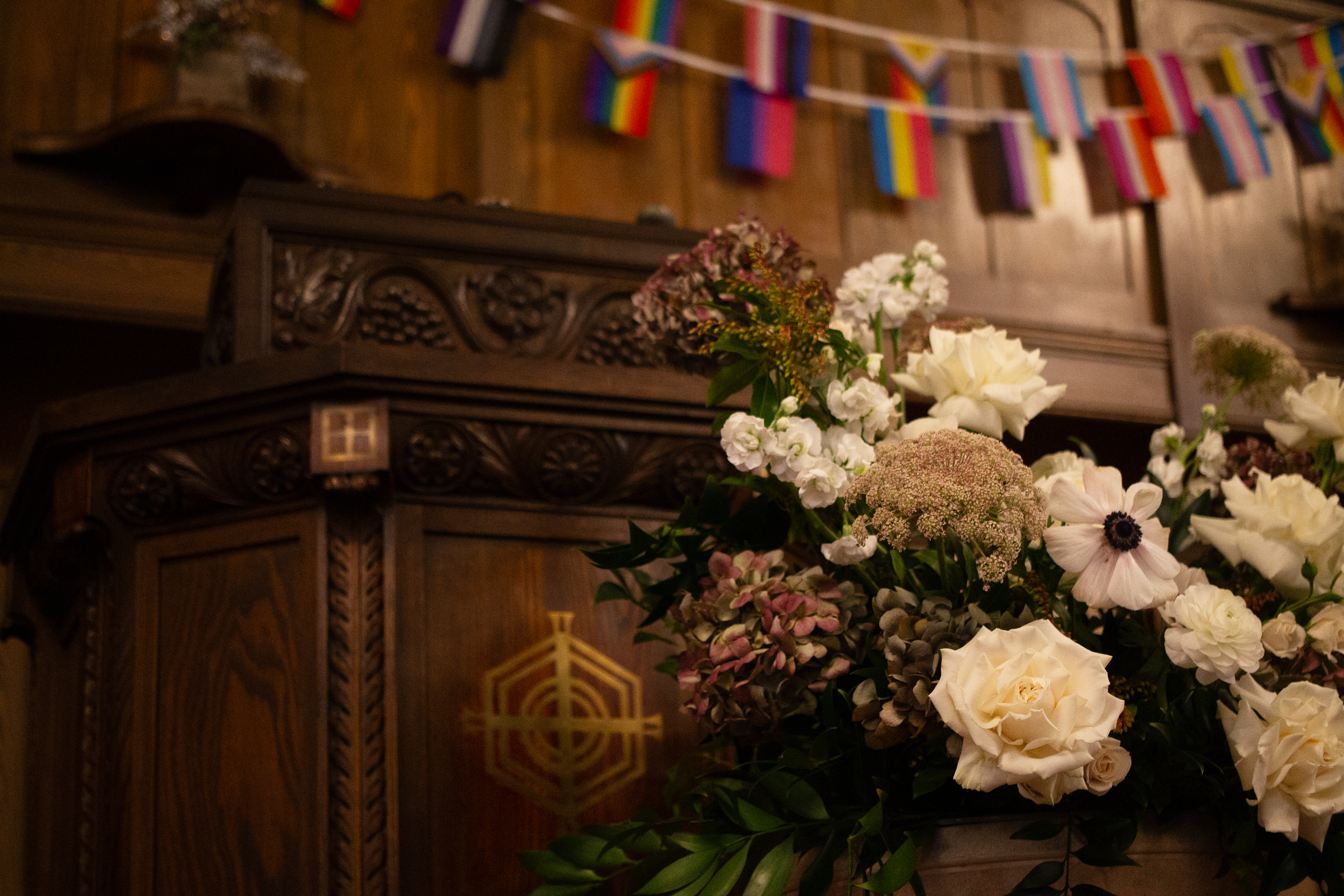

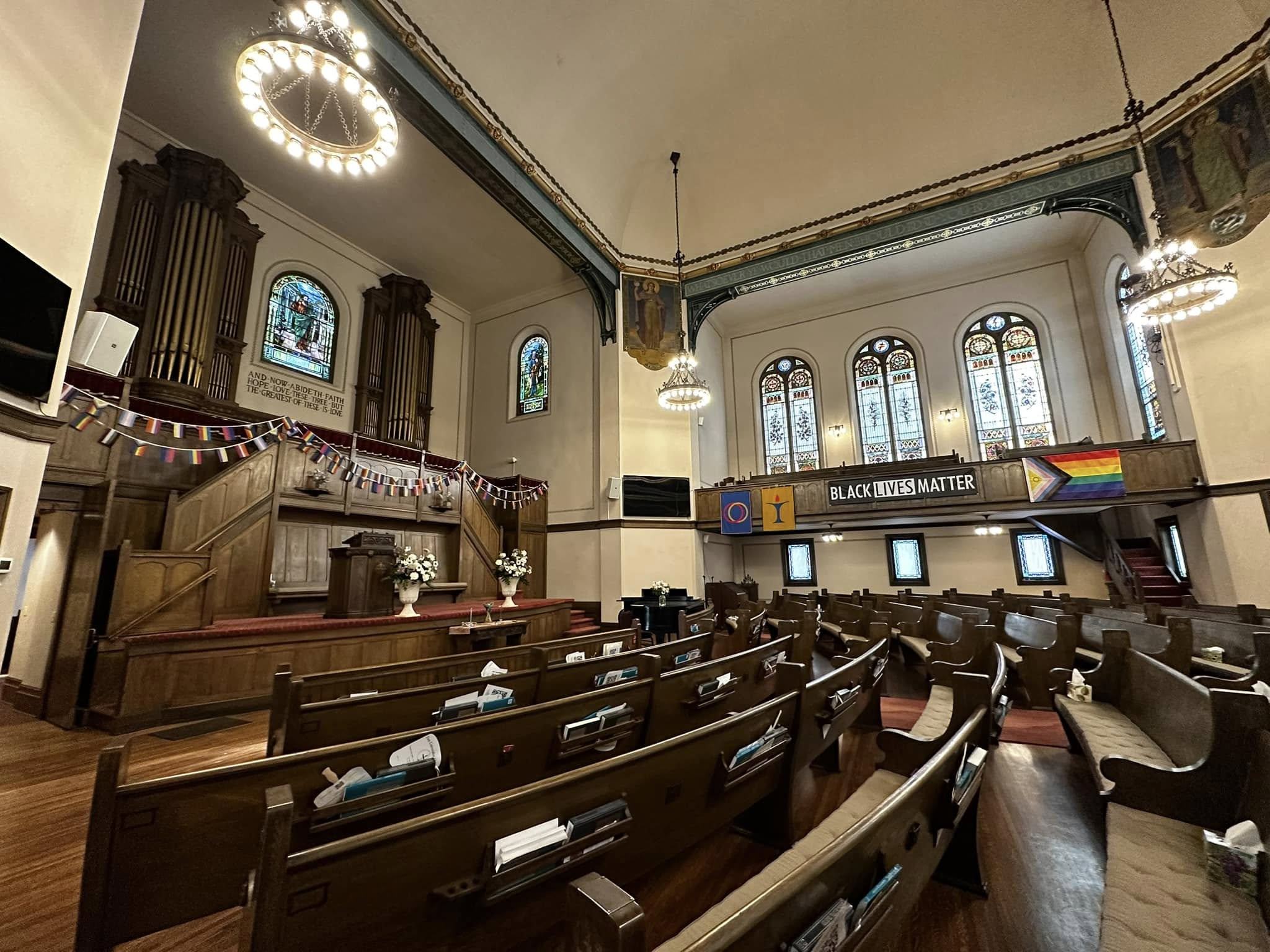

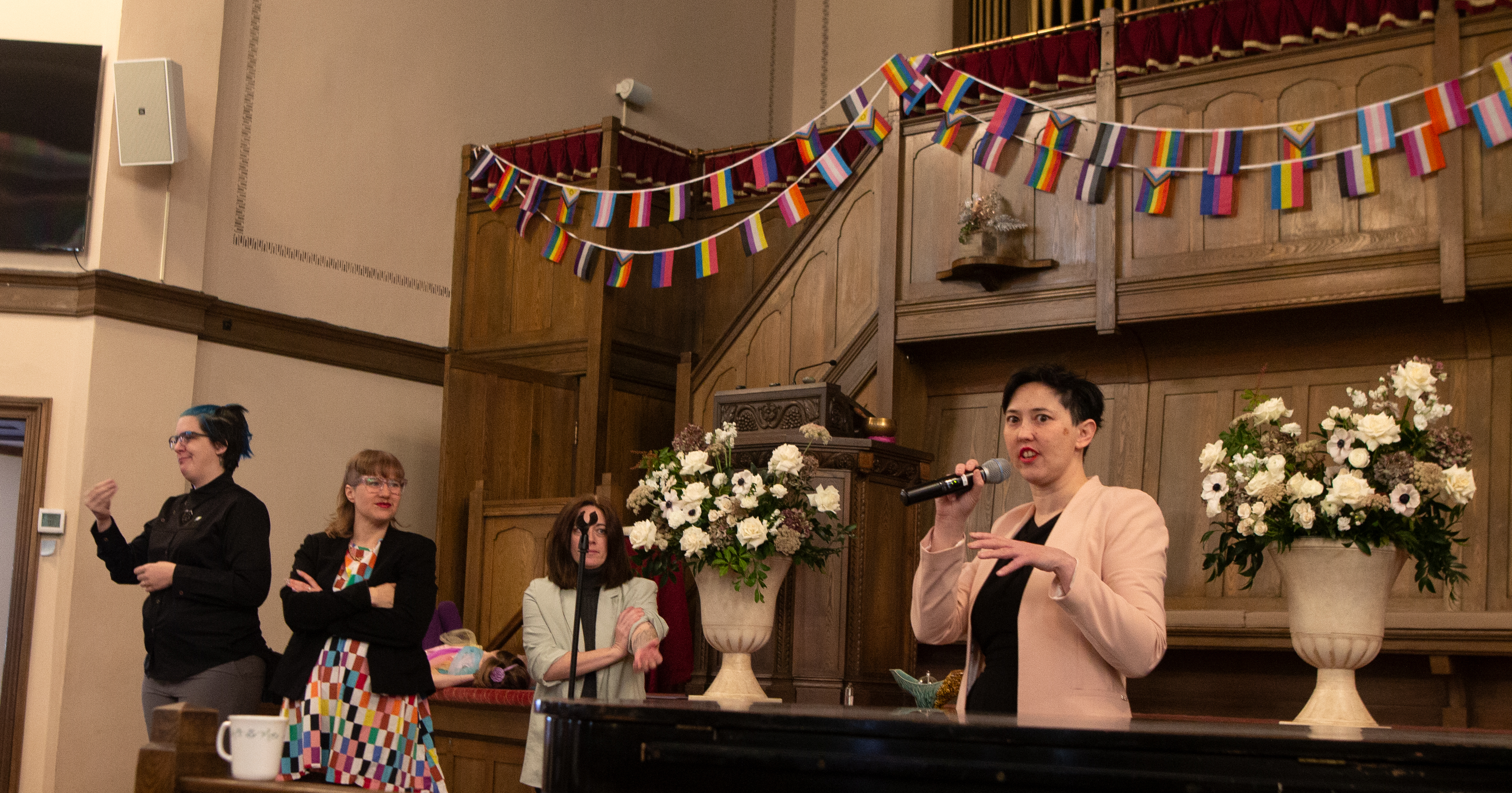

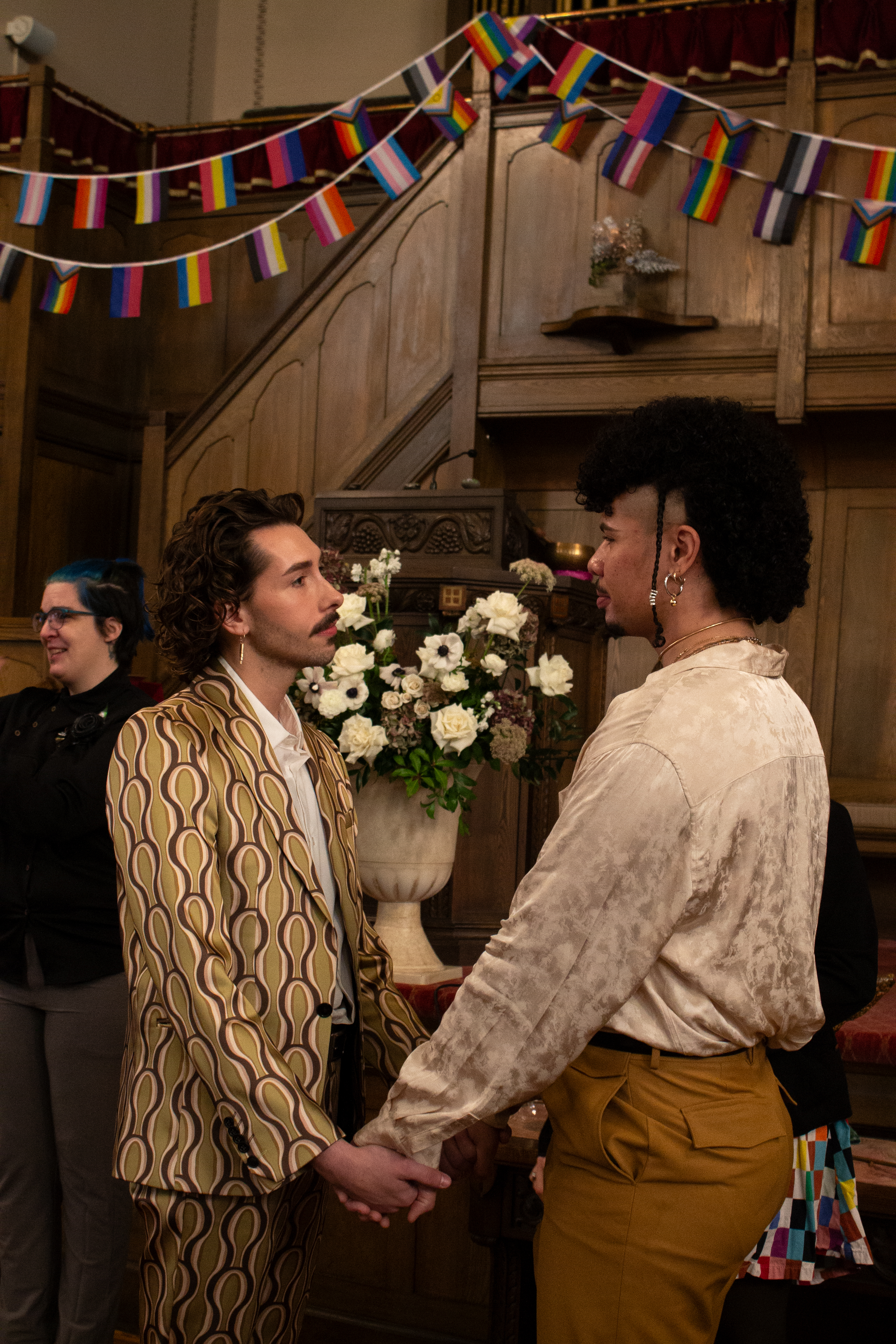

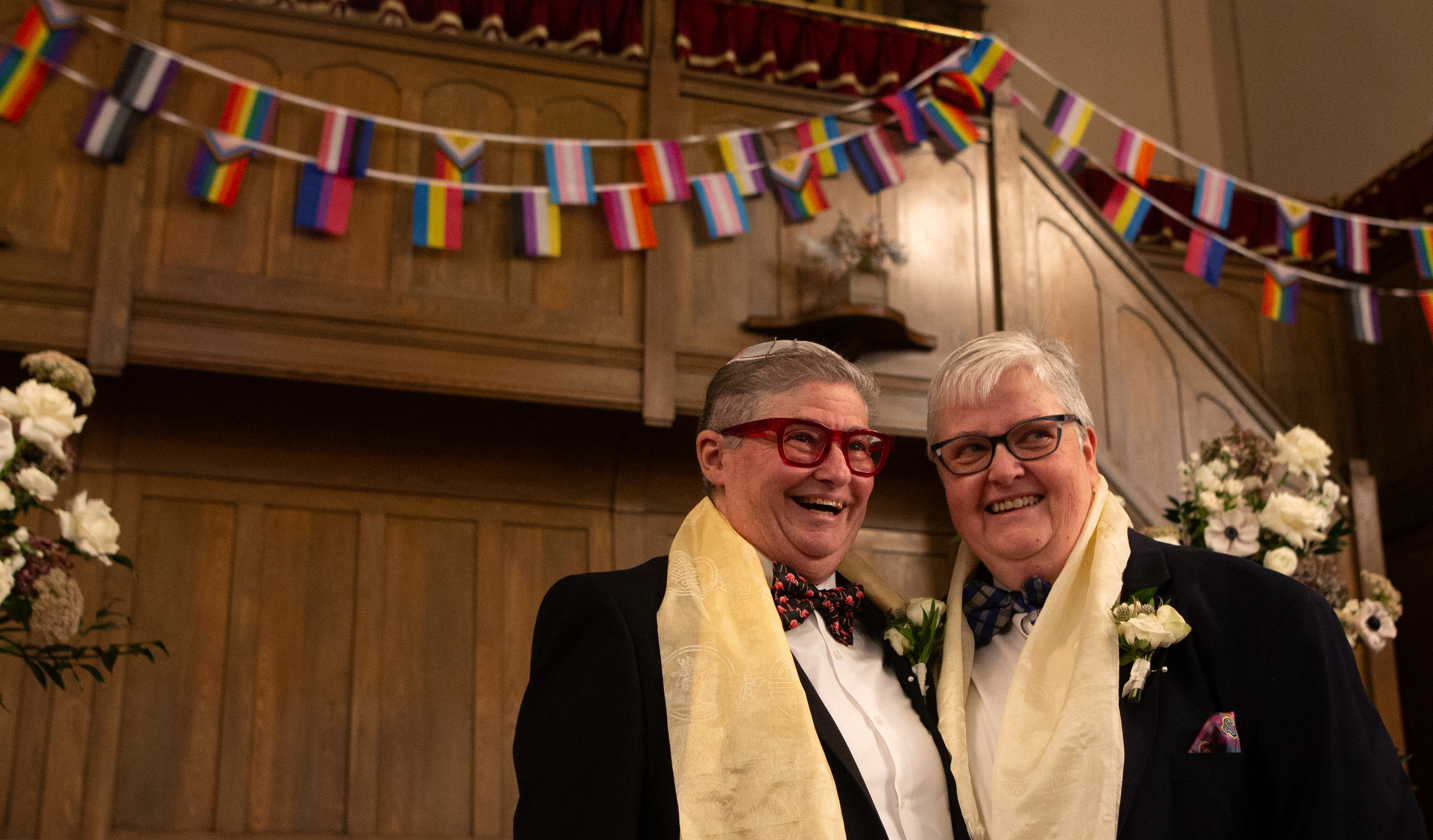

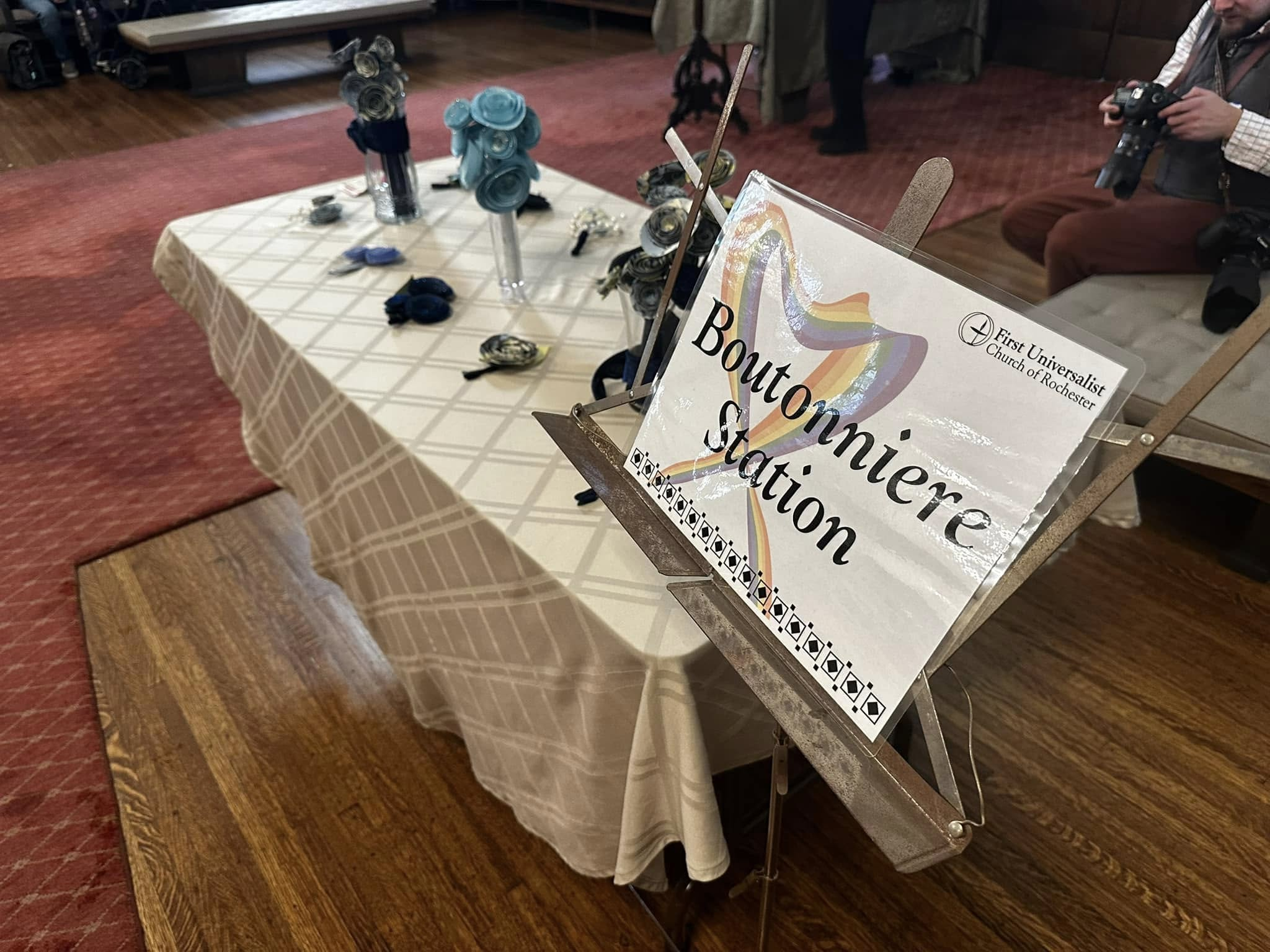

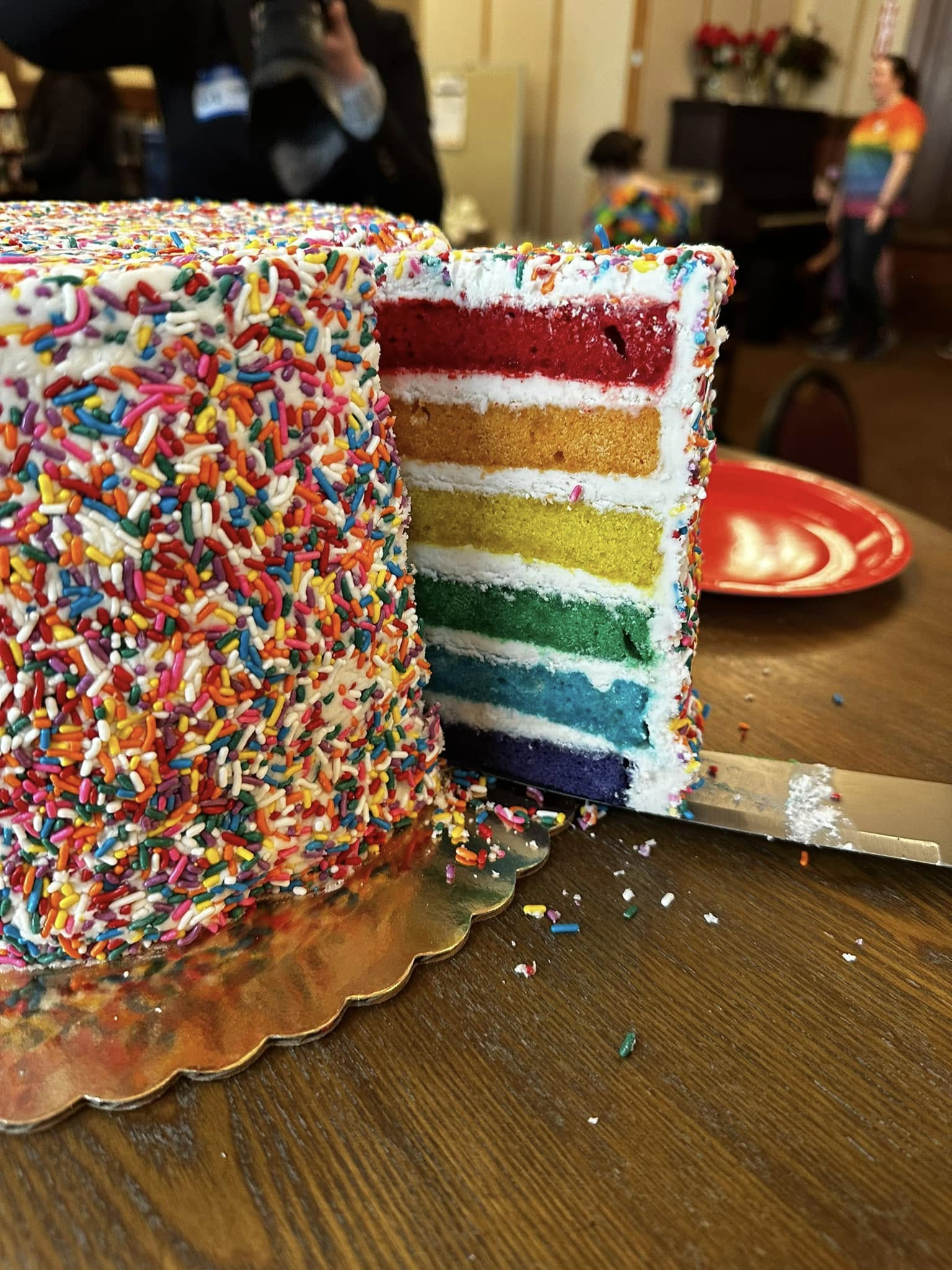

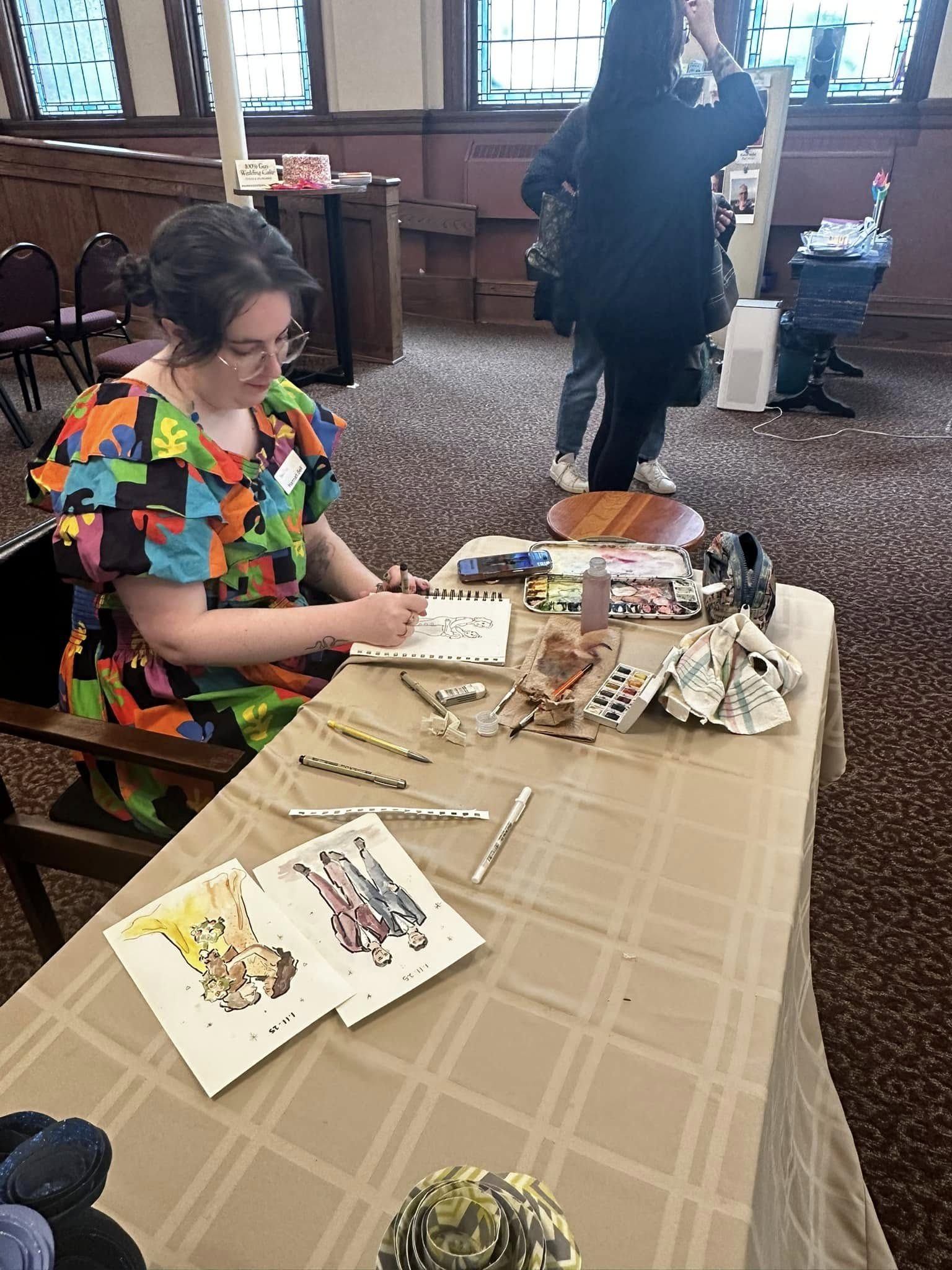

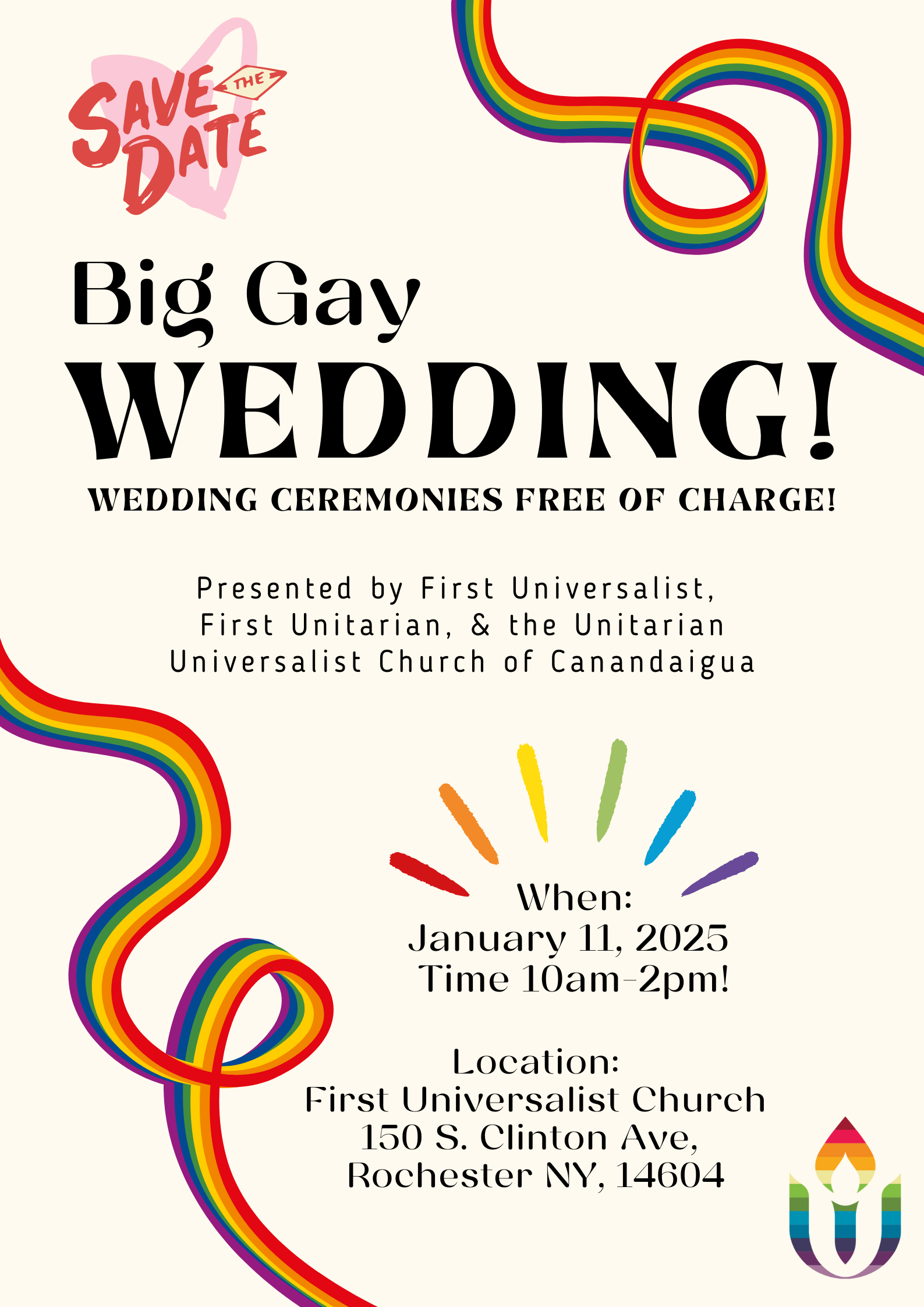
Big Gay Wedding promo graphic

=== "Trans Lives are Sacred" Banner ===
In the fall of 2025, First Universalist congregation members supported the hanging of an outdoor "Trans Lives are Sacred" banner on the church building after several listening sessions.

== Architecture ==
It was designed by noted Rochester architect Claude Fayette Bragdon, and is in the Romanesque Revival style. It is of brick with stone and ceramic tile trim and features a central tower and lantern with pyramidal roofs. The Library of Congress notes describe the building architecture as "Unified in concept, harmonious in proportions and color, the major portion of the structure remains essentially unaltered."

It was added to the National Register of Historic Places on 27 May 1971.

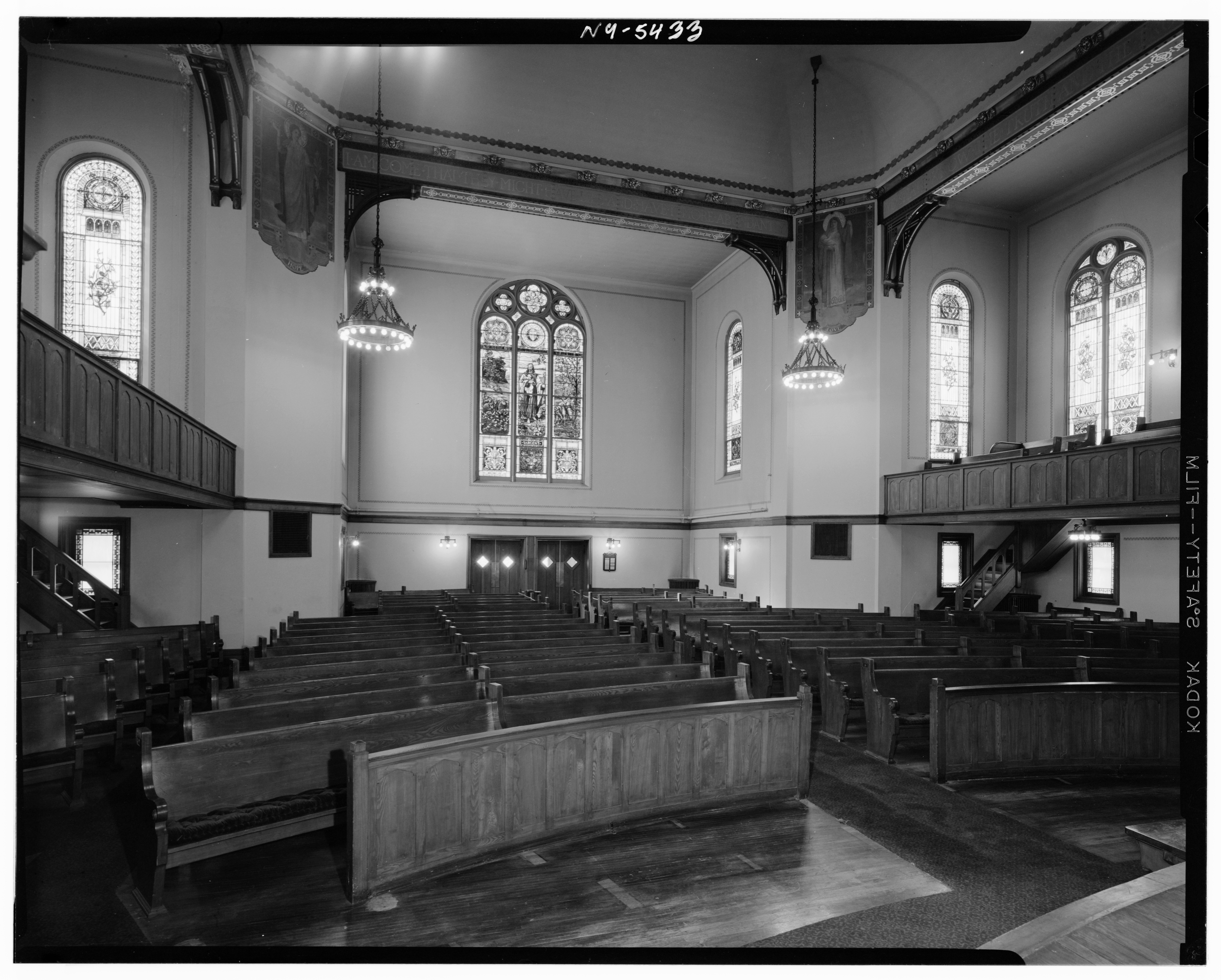

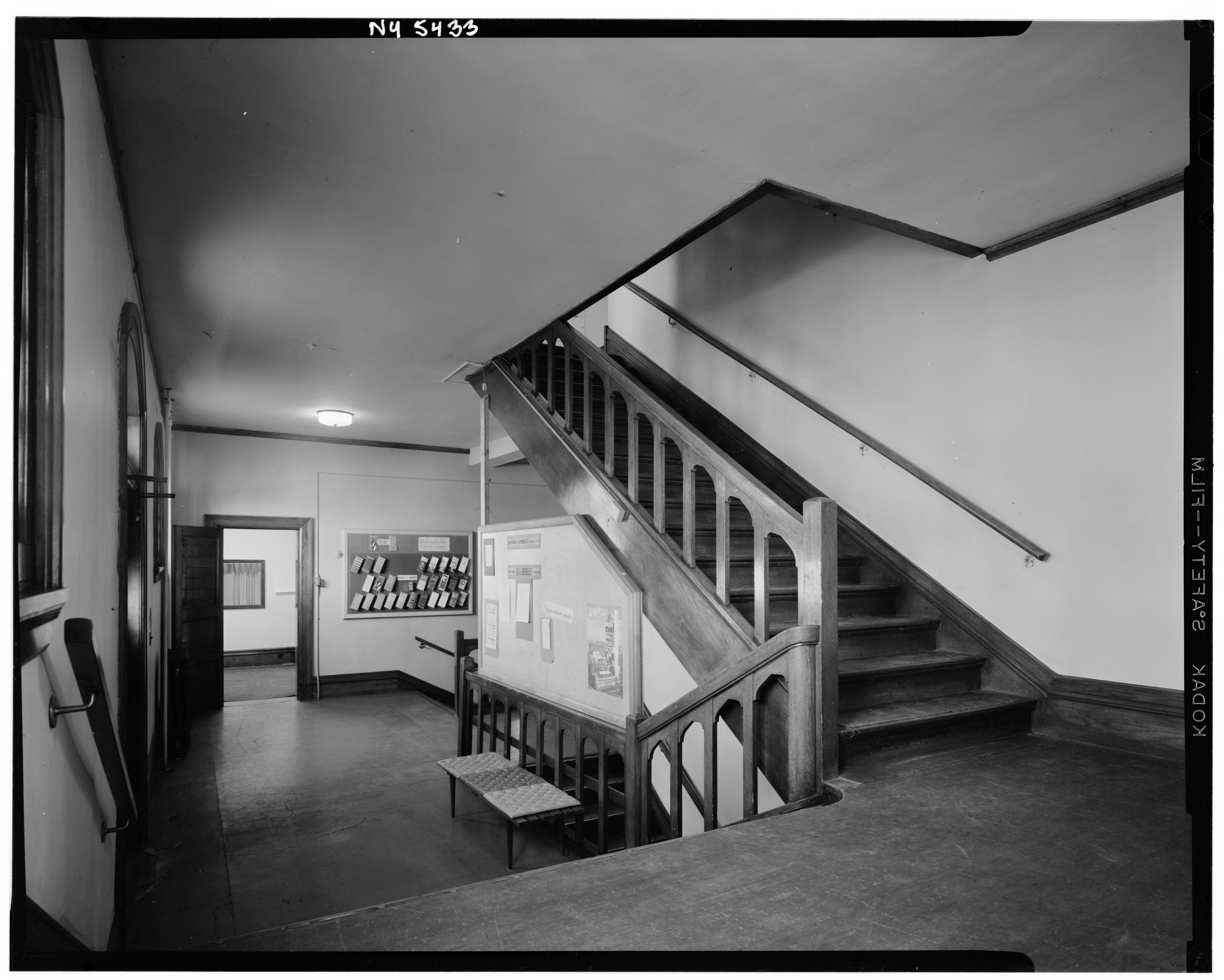

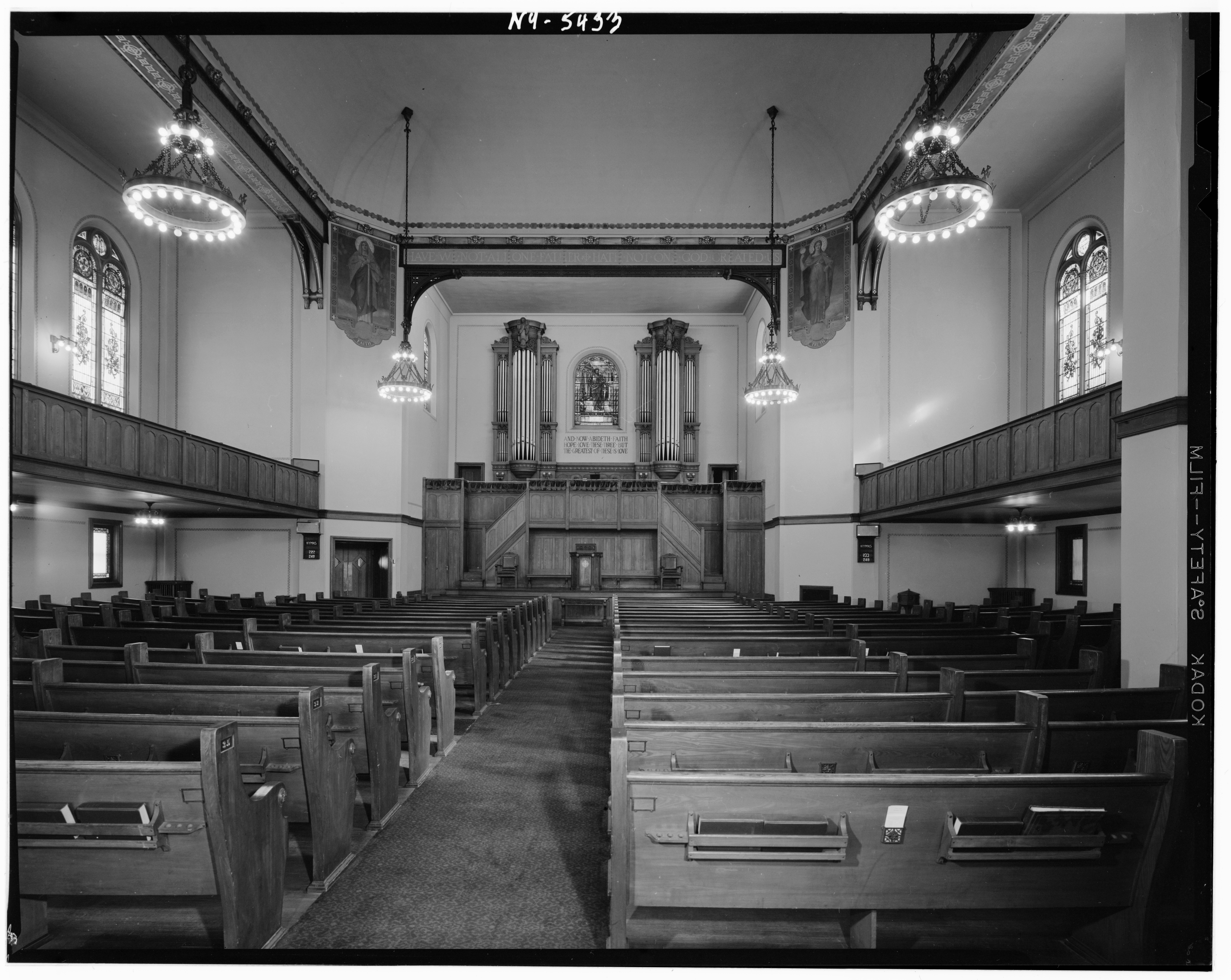

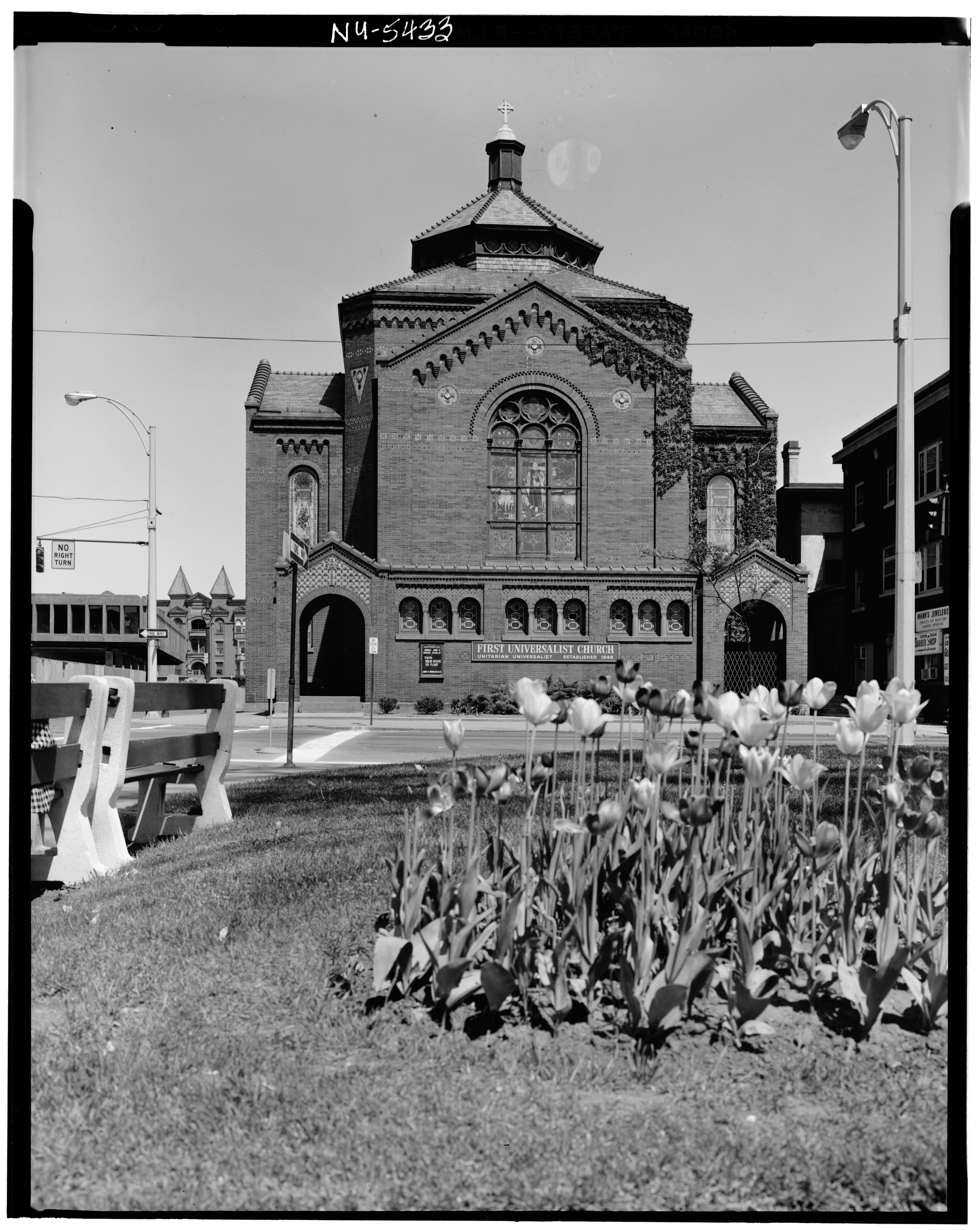

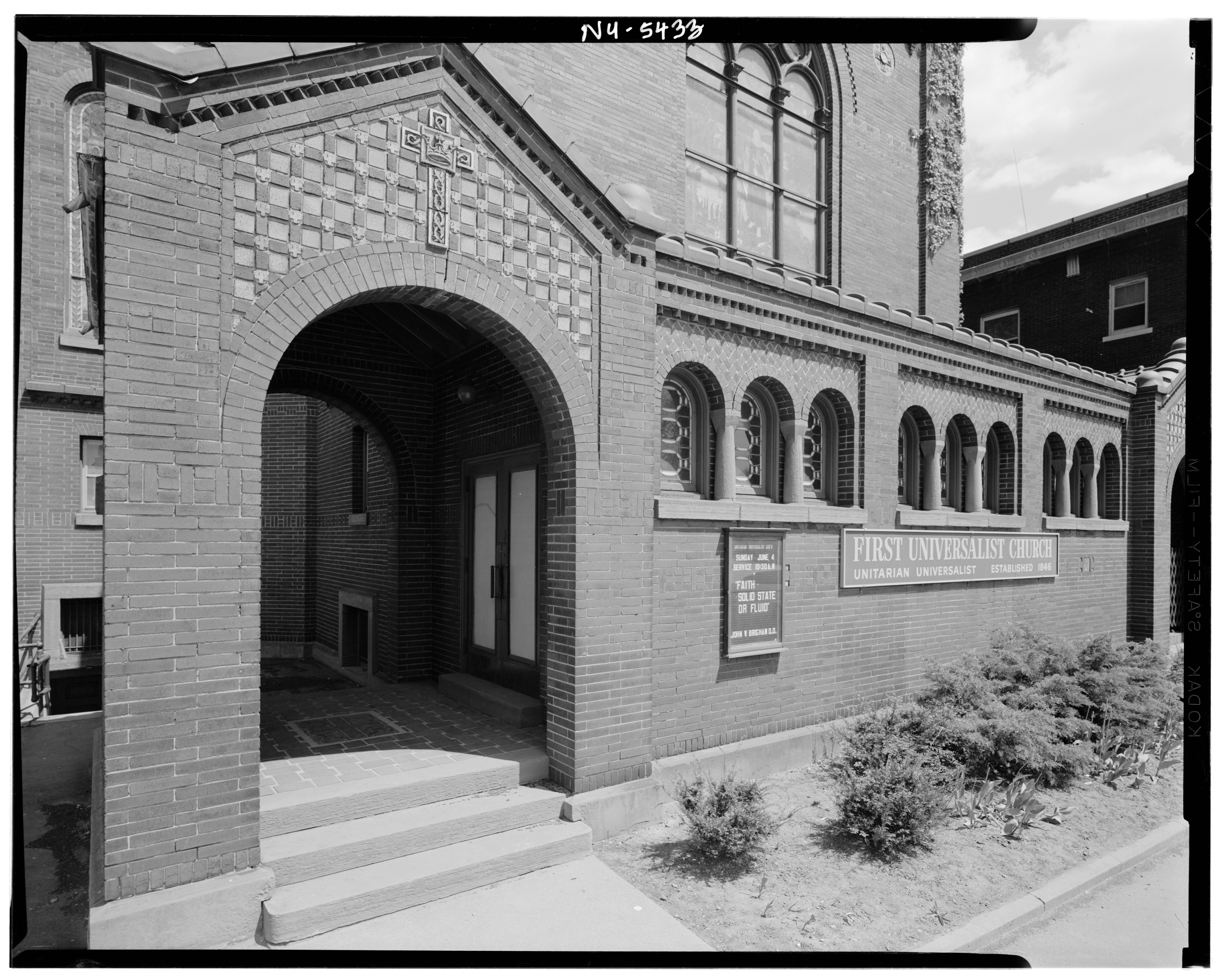

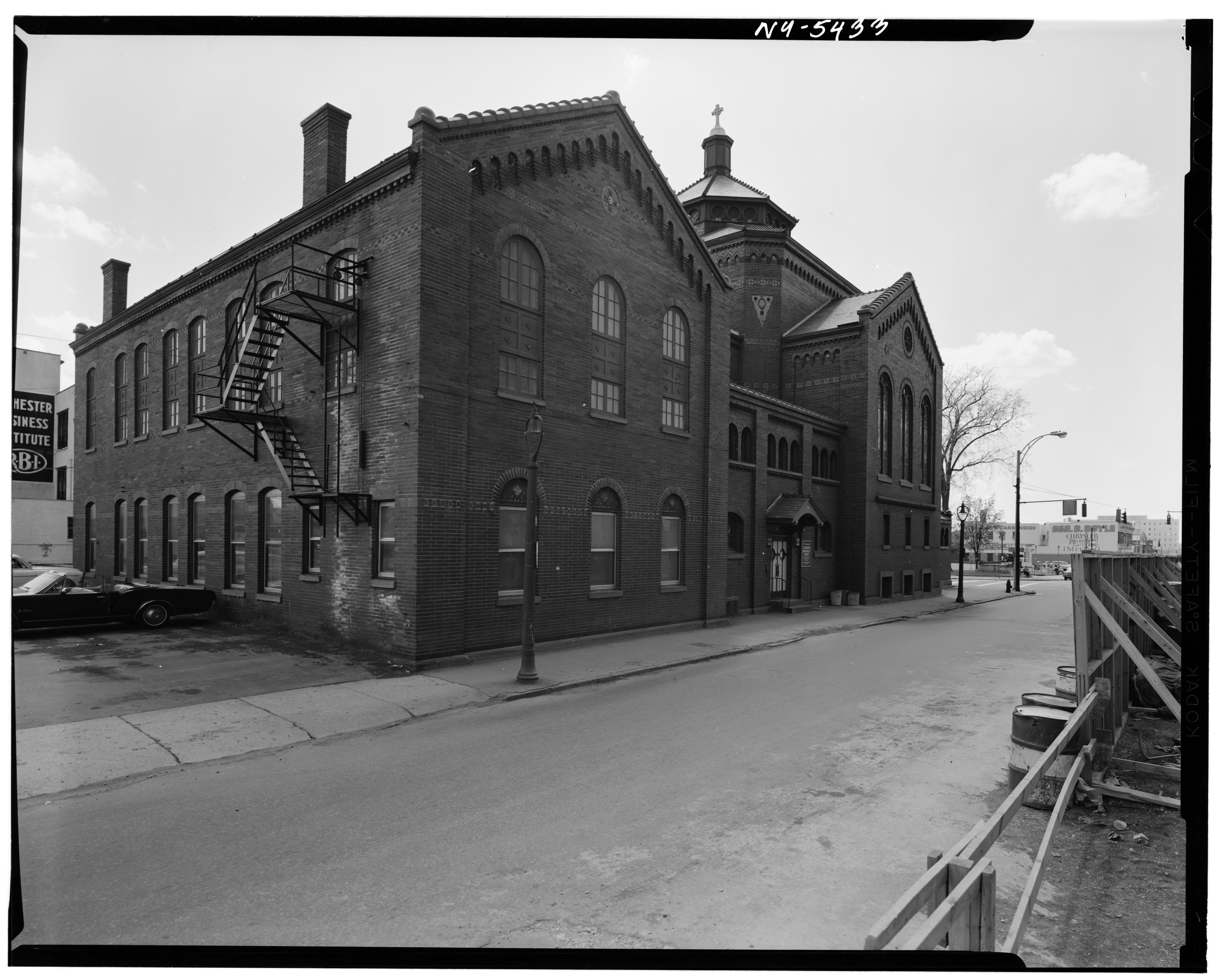

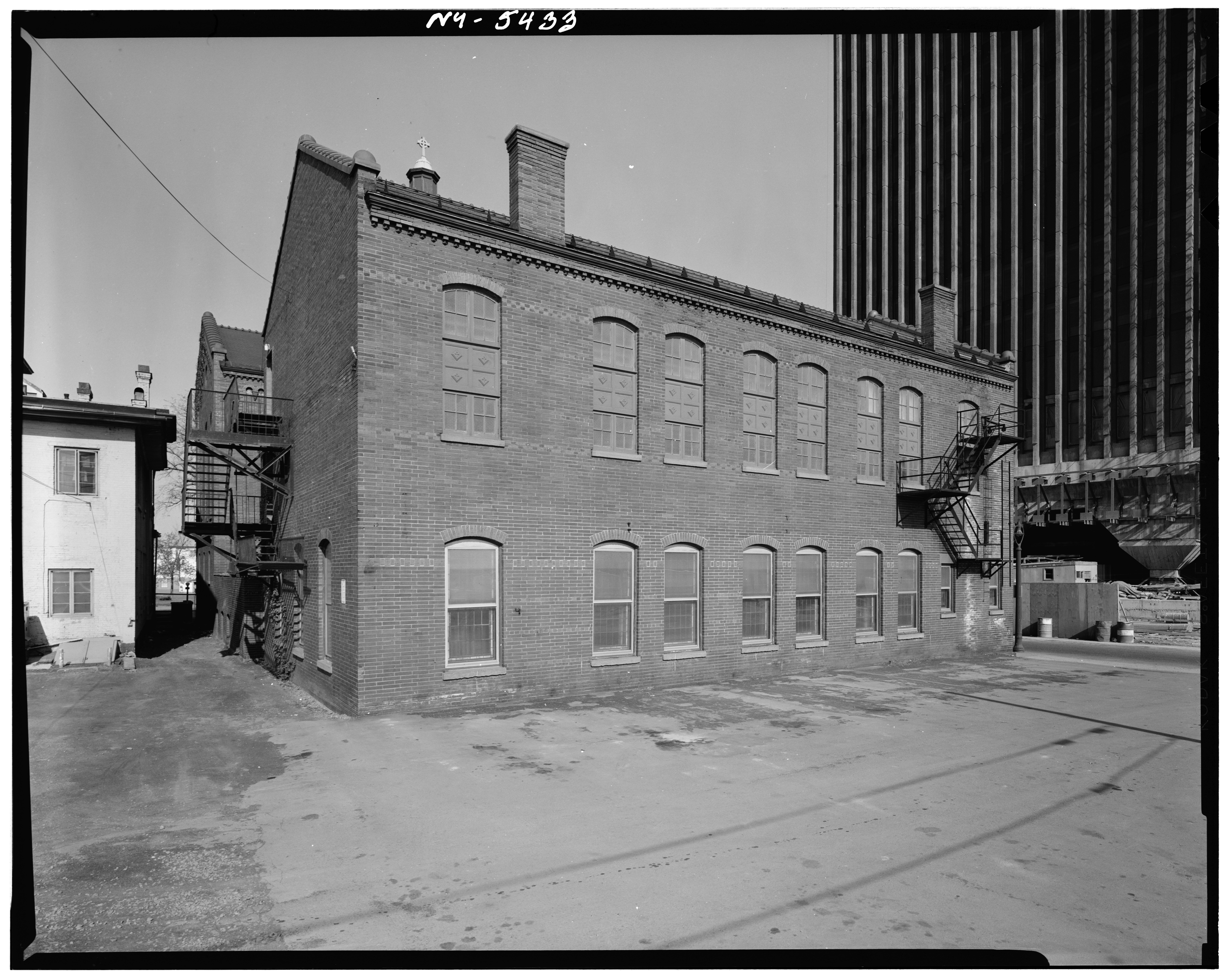

== Little Free Library ==
First Universalist is home to a Little Free Library, which is regularly stocked with books, clothing, etc. for anyone to peruse or take. The roof suffered damage from an unknown source over the summer of 2019, and has since been shingled, rebuilt, and reinstalled as of September 2019.

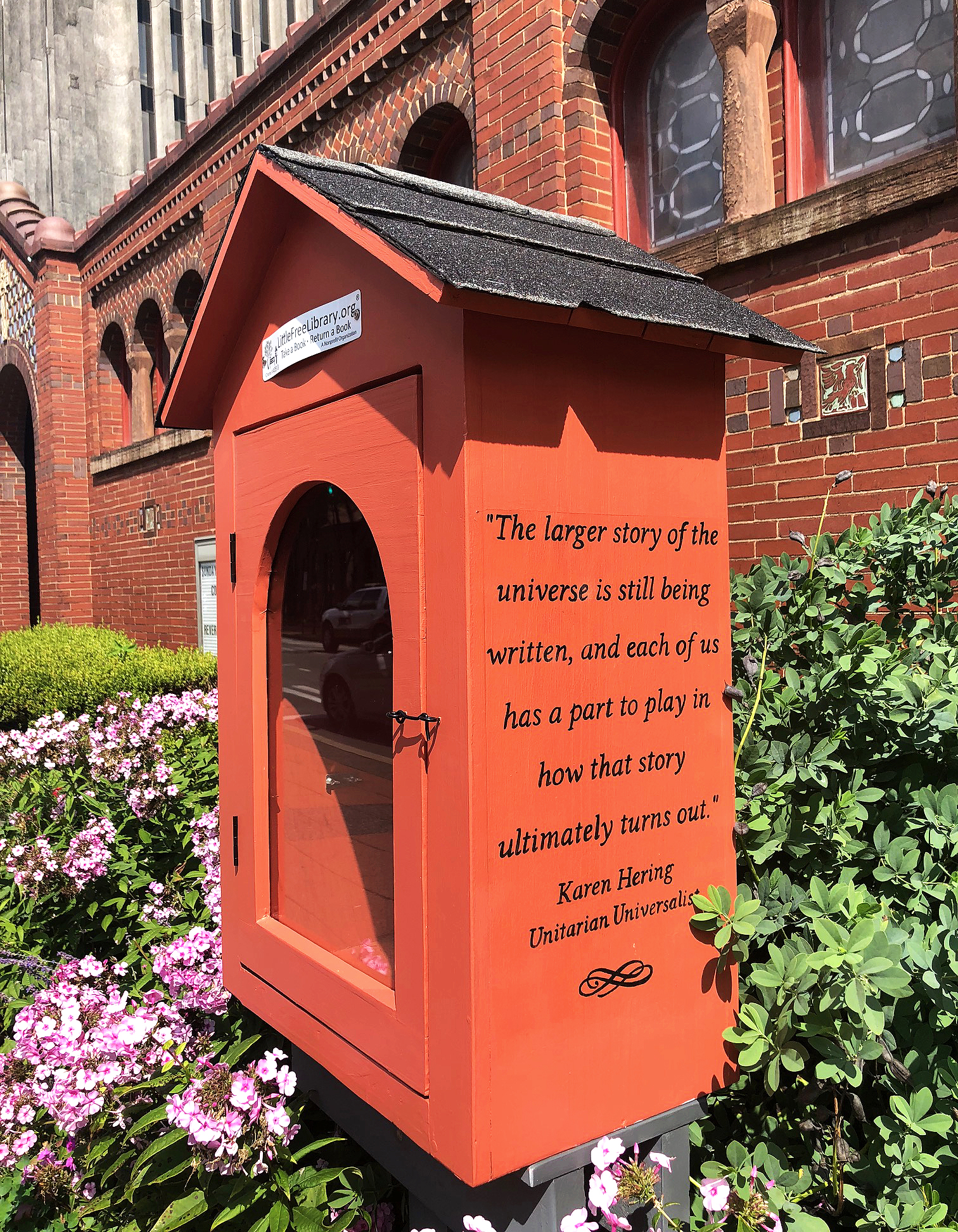

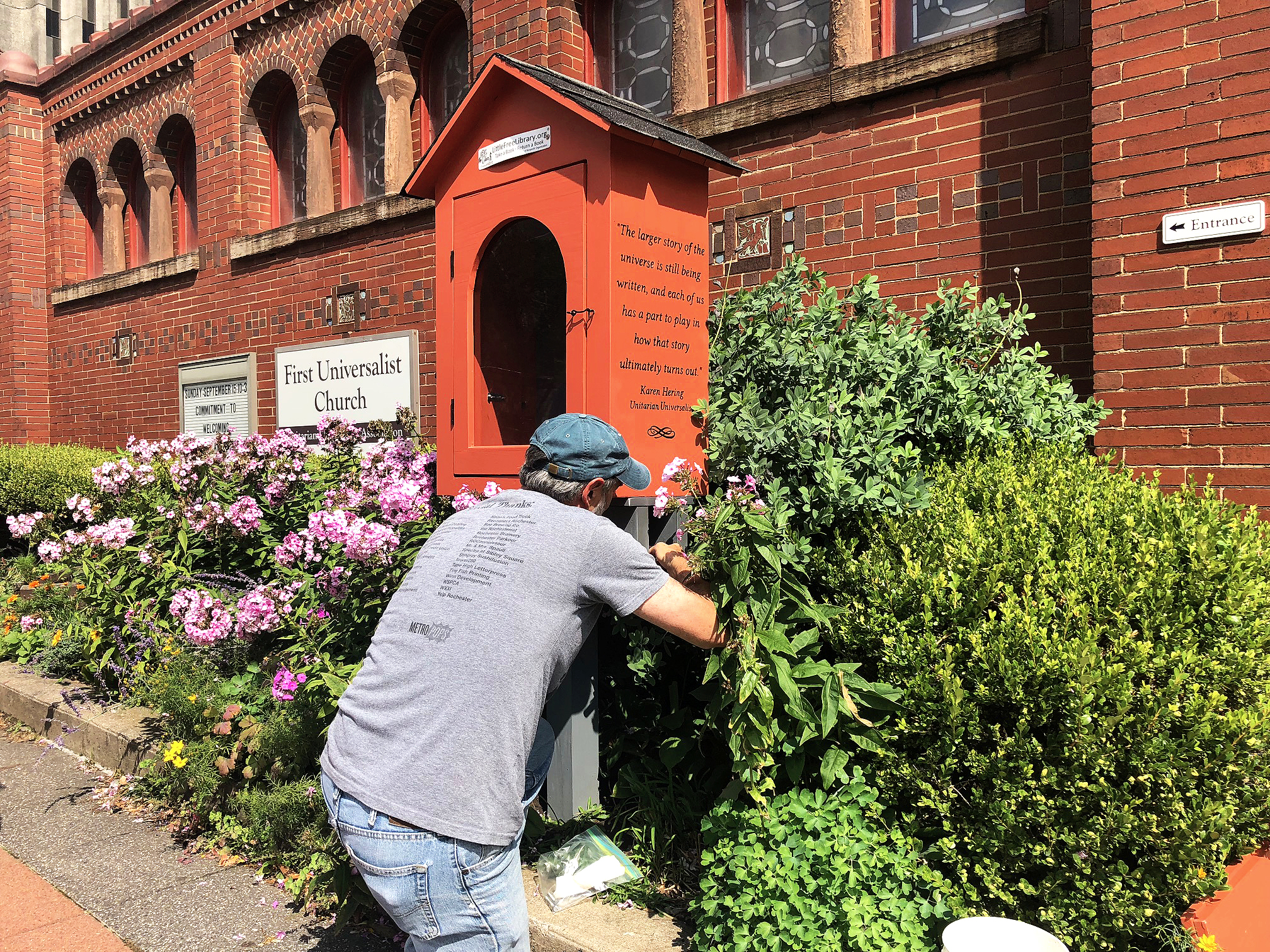

== Hope-Jones Organ ==
First Universalist Church of Rochester is home to a fully preserved Hope-Jones organ, which has been described as sounding "weighty and lush", with large-scaled 8′ stops. Few Hope-Jones organs have survived to the present time.

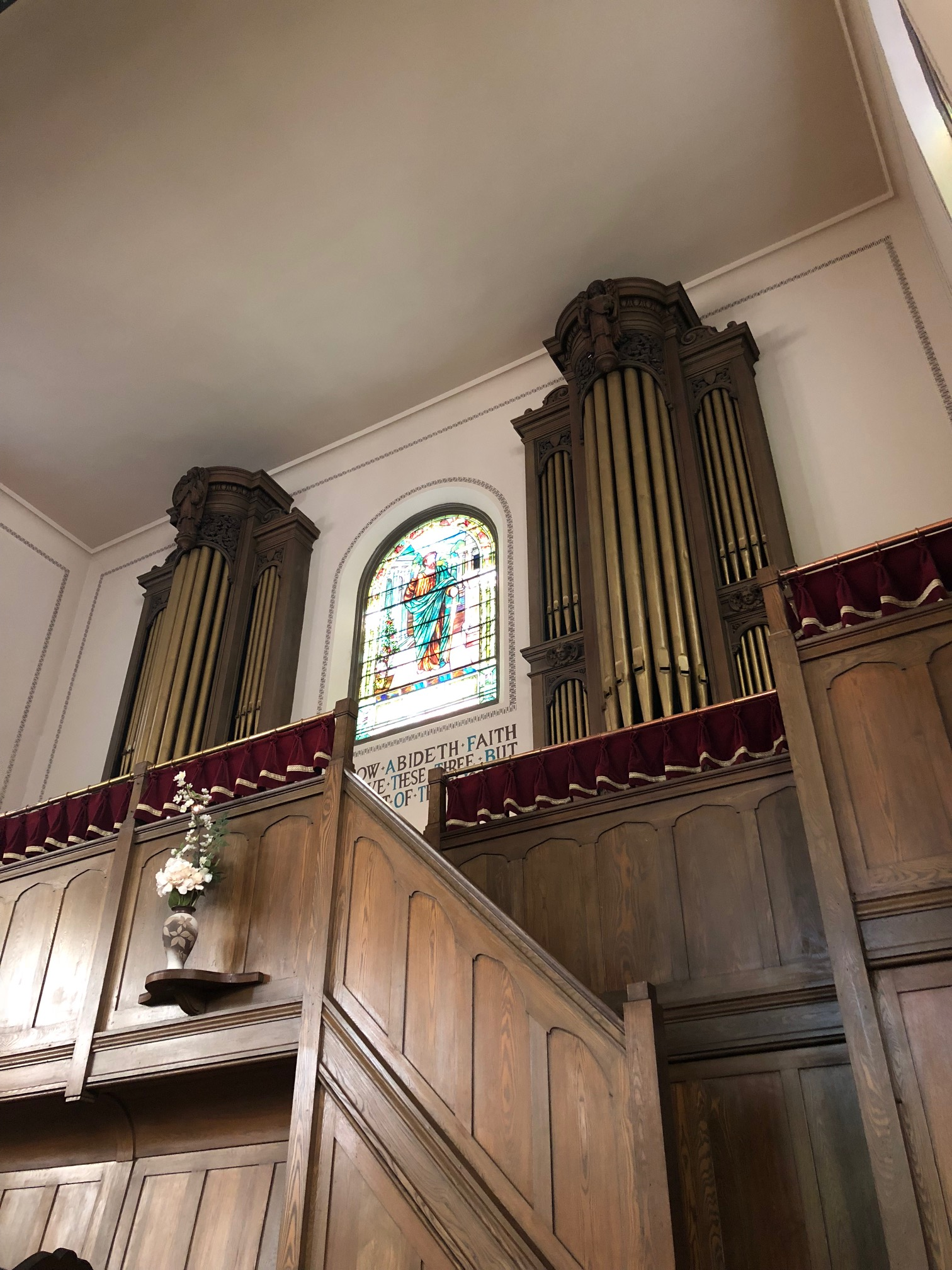
View of the historic Hope-Jones organ in the First Universalist Church of Rochester from the sanctuary floor.

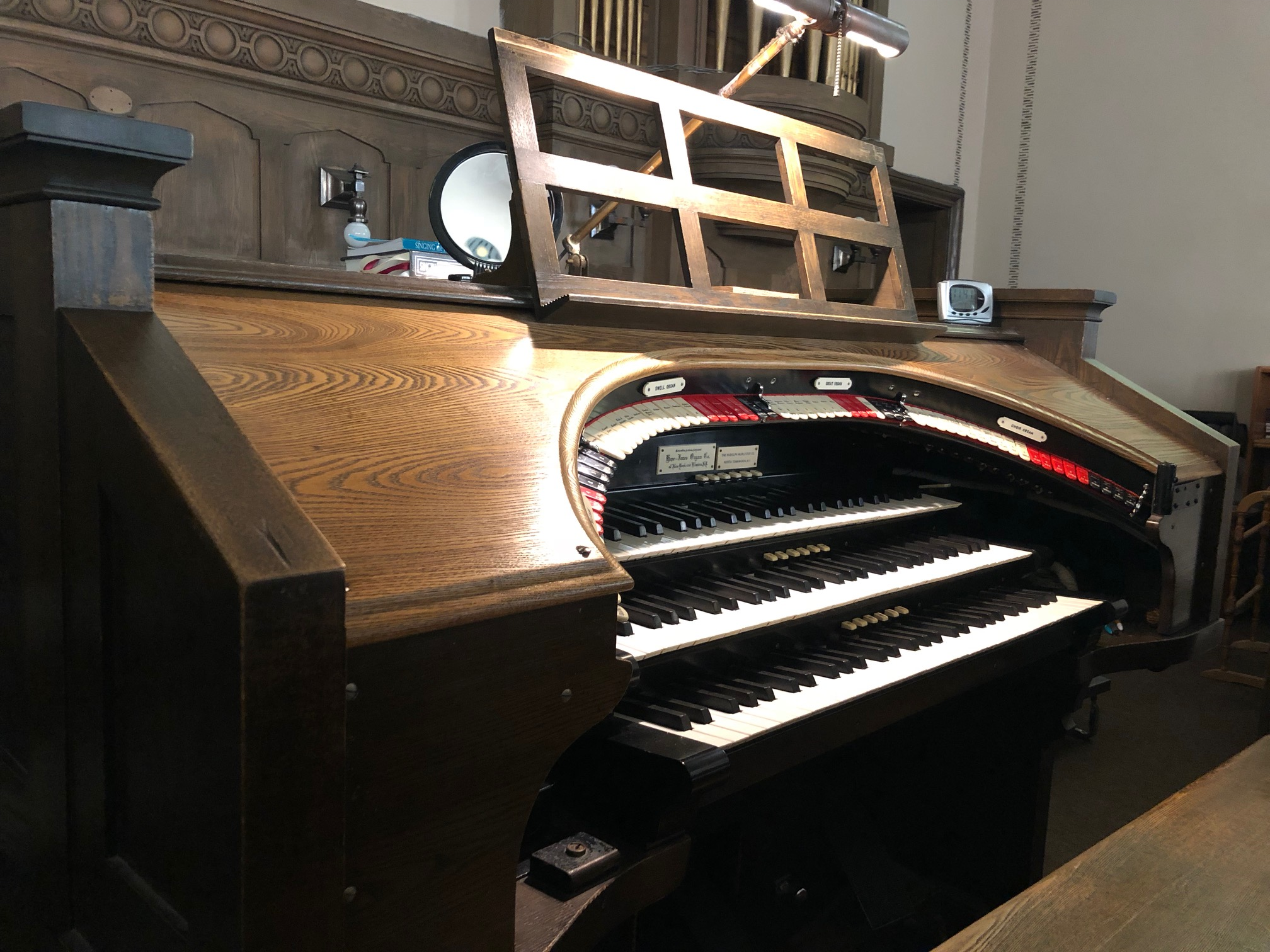
View of the historic Hope-Jones organ keys in the First Universalist Church of Rochester.
