= Shingleside =

Historic home in Rochester, New York, USA

- U.S. National Register of Historic Places
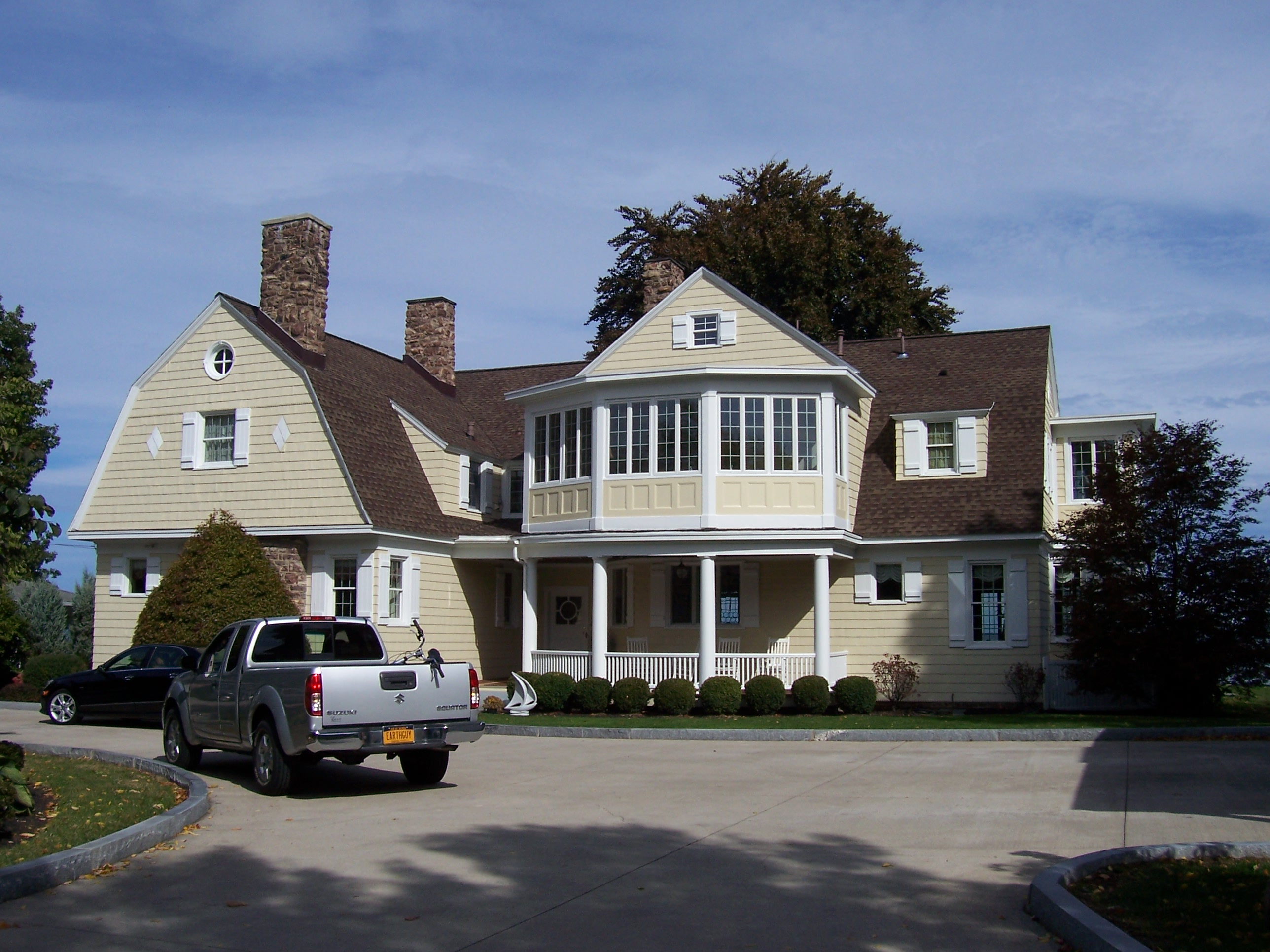

- Location within New York Location within the United States
- Location: 476 Beach Ave., Rochester, New York
- Coordinates: 43°15′46″N 77°36′56″W
- Area: 0.6 acres (0.24 ha)
- Built: 1898
- Architect: Bragdon, Claude Fayette
- Architectural style: Colonial Revival, Shingle Style
- NRHP reference No.: 84002737
- Added to NRHP: September 13, 1984

Shingleside is a historic home in Rochester in Monroe County, New York. It was constructed in 1898–1899 and is an L-shaped, 2 1/2-story, wood-framed, wood-shingled, gambrel-roofed house. It was designed by noted local architect Claude Fayette Bragdon in a style influenced by the Shingle and Colonial Revival styles.

It was listed on the National Register of Historic Places in 1984.

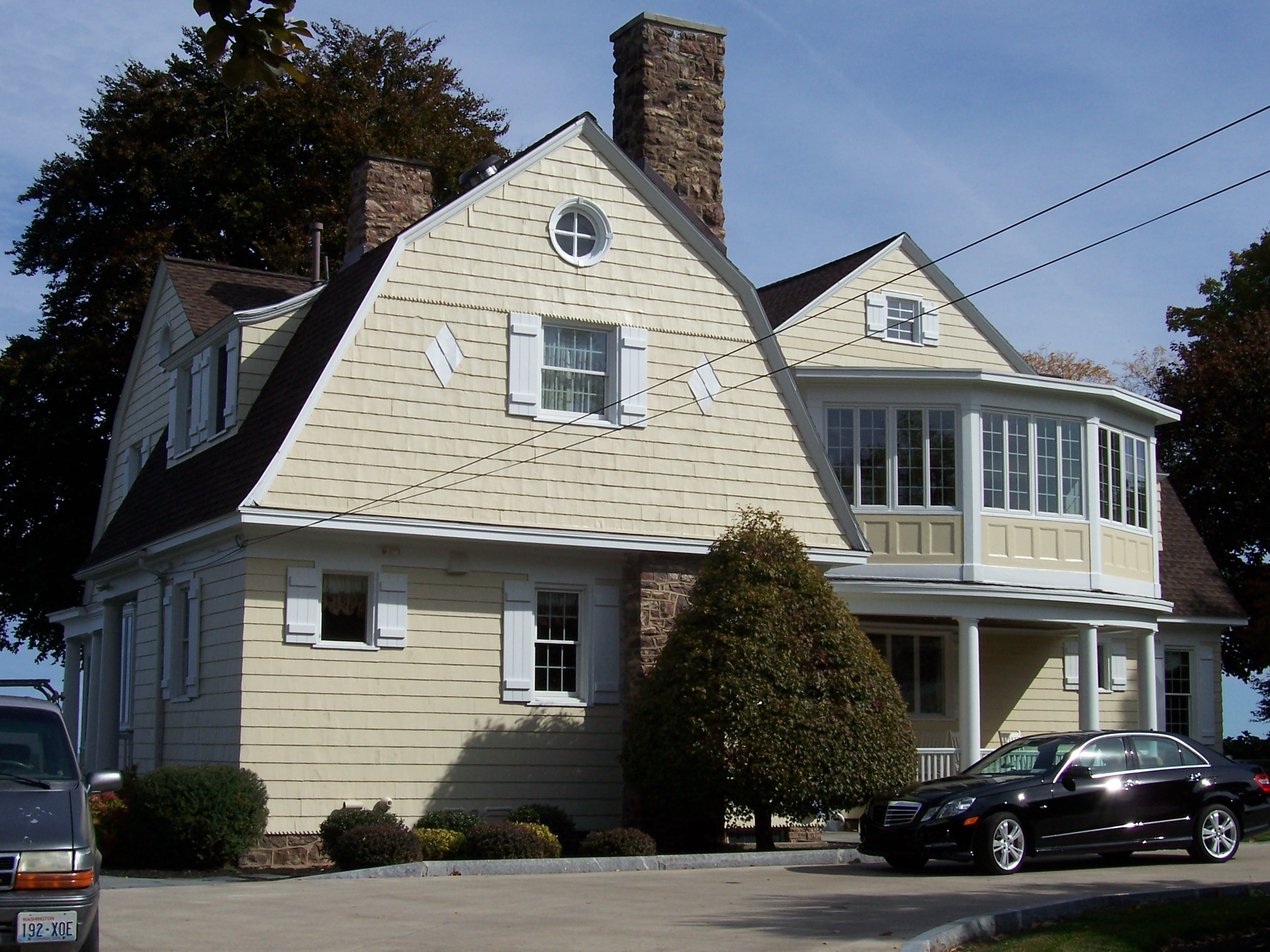

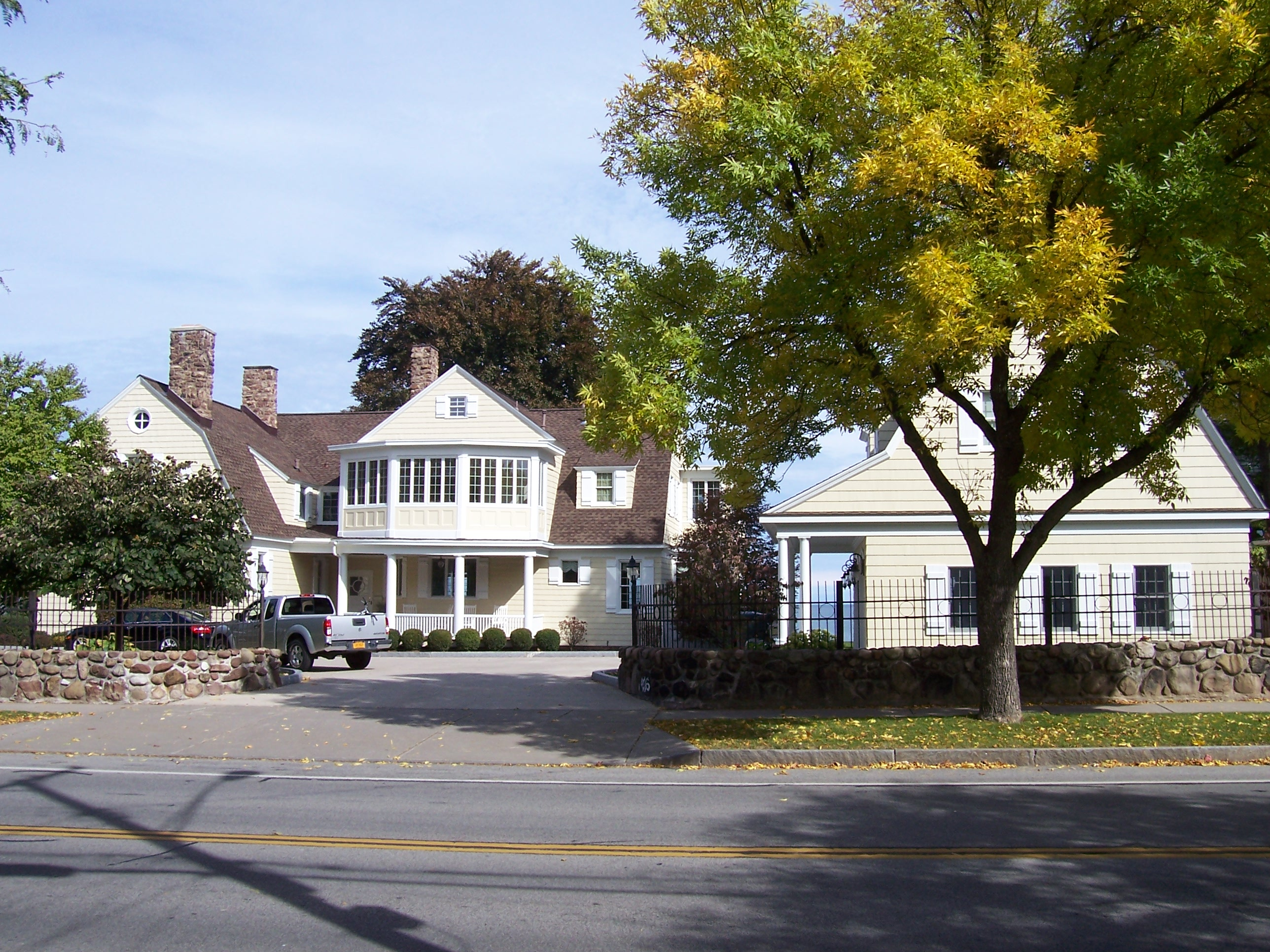
