= Romanta T. Miller House =

Historic house in New York, United States

- U.S. National Register of Historic Places
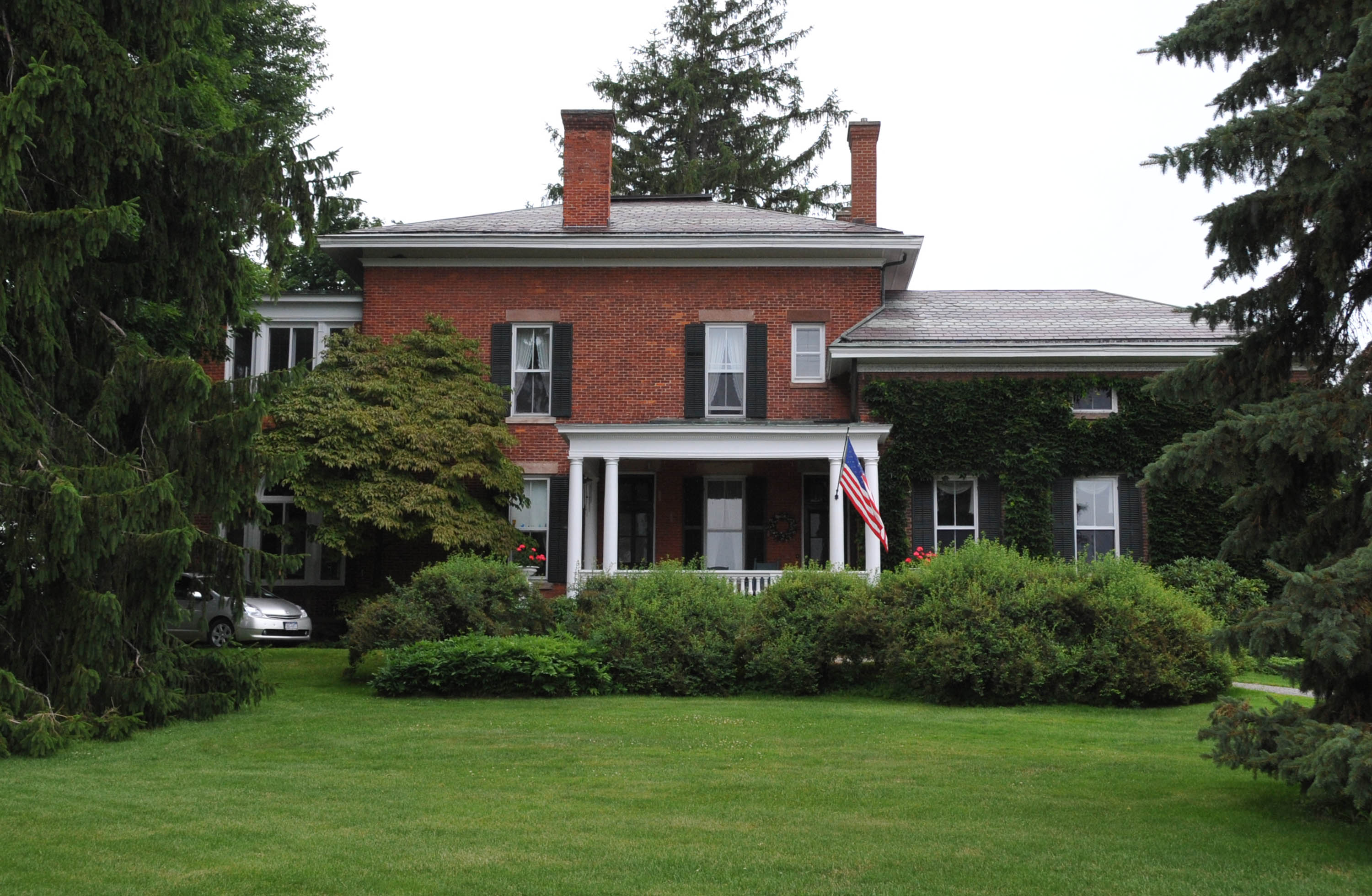
- Romanta T. Miller House, January 2008

- Location within New York Location within the United States
- Location: 1089 Bowerman Rd., Wheatland, New York
- Coordinates: 42°59′25″N 77°46′11″W
- Area: 4.4 acres (1.8 ha)
- Built: 1869-1870, 1914, 1940
- Architect: Loomis, Isaac; Bragdon, Claude
- Architectural style: Italianate, Colonial Revival
- NRHP reference No.: 14000144
- Added to NRHP: April 11, 2014

Romanta T. Miller House, also known as the Fraser Farm, is a historic home located at Wheatland, Monroe County, New York. It was built in 1869–1870, and is a two-story, Italianate style brick and masonry dwelling. The house has a 1 1/2-story rear kitchen addition. It sits on a cut limestone foundation and has an overhanging slate roof. It features a Colonial Revival full height entrance and sleeping porch designed by architect Claude Fayette Bragdon and added in 1914. Also on the property are the contributing large U-shaped barn (c. 1870, 1940) and a small garden shed / machine shop.

It was listed on the National Register of Historic Places in 2014.
