= Chamber of Commerce (Rochester, New York) =

Historic commercial building in New York, United States

- U.S. National Register of Historic Places
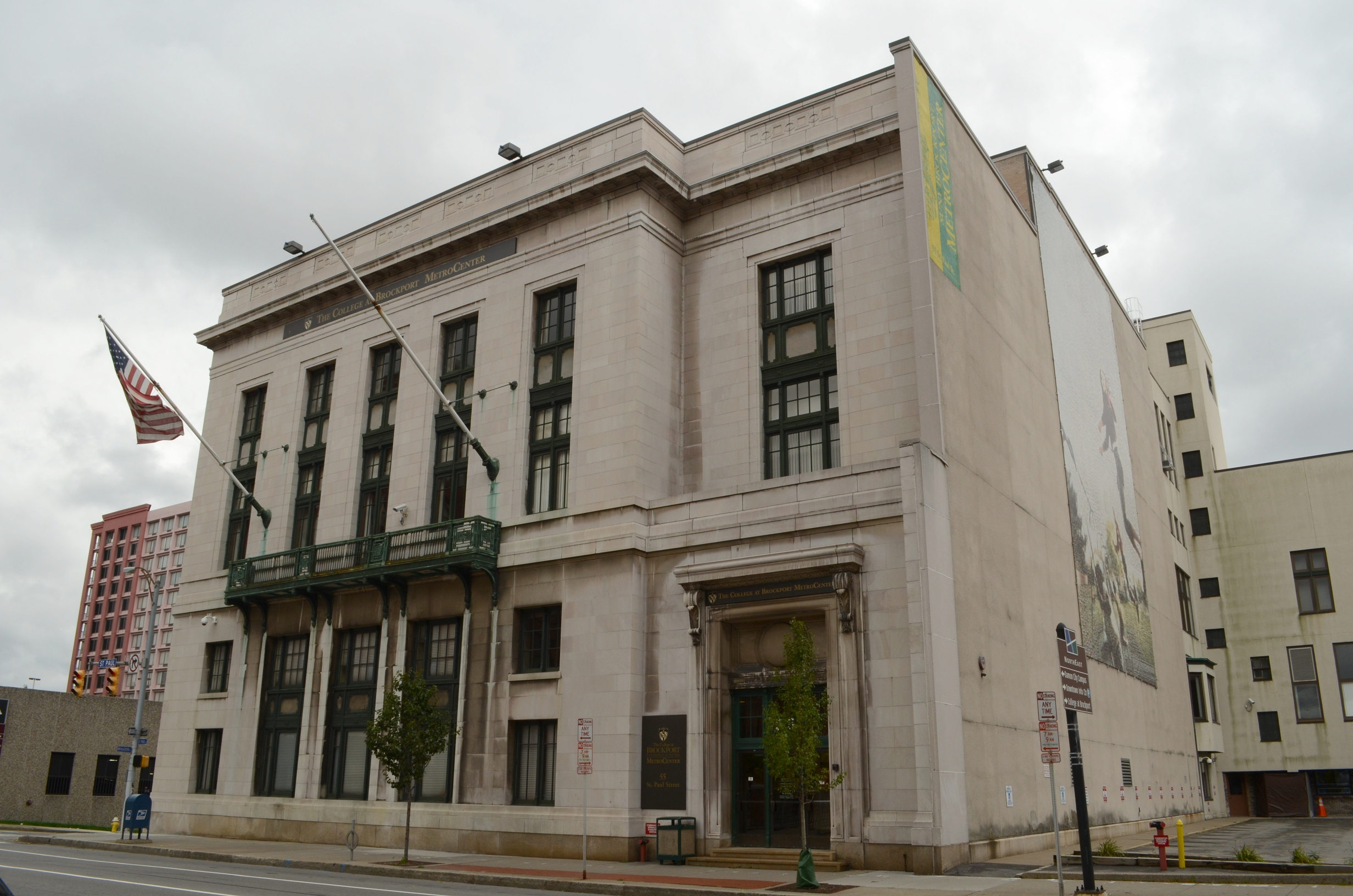
- Chamber of Commerce, September 2012

- Location within New York Location within the United States
- Location: 55 Saint Paul St., Rochester, New York
- Coordinates: 43°9′28″N 77°36′36″W
- Area: less than one acre
- Built: 1916
- Architect: Bragdon, Claude; Evans, Charles
- Architectural style: Classical Revival, Beaux Arts
- MPS: Inner Loop MRA
- NRHP reference No.: 85002859
- Added to NRHP: October 04, 1985

Chamber of Commerce is a historic chamber of commerce building located at 55 St. Paul Street, Rochester, Monroe County, New York. The building was a gift from George Eastman. It is a four-story building in the Classical Revival/Beaux-Arts style designed by Claude Fayette Bragdon and built in 1916. A seven-bay addition to the building was completed in 1925.

It was listed on the National Register of Historic Places in 1985.

In 2001 the building was sold for $1.4 million to State University of New York Brockport as home for their MetroCenter.

== See also ==
- National Register of Historic Places listings in Rochester, New York
