= Bevier Memorial Building =

Building in Rochester, New York

- U.S. National Register of Historic Places
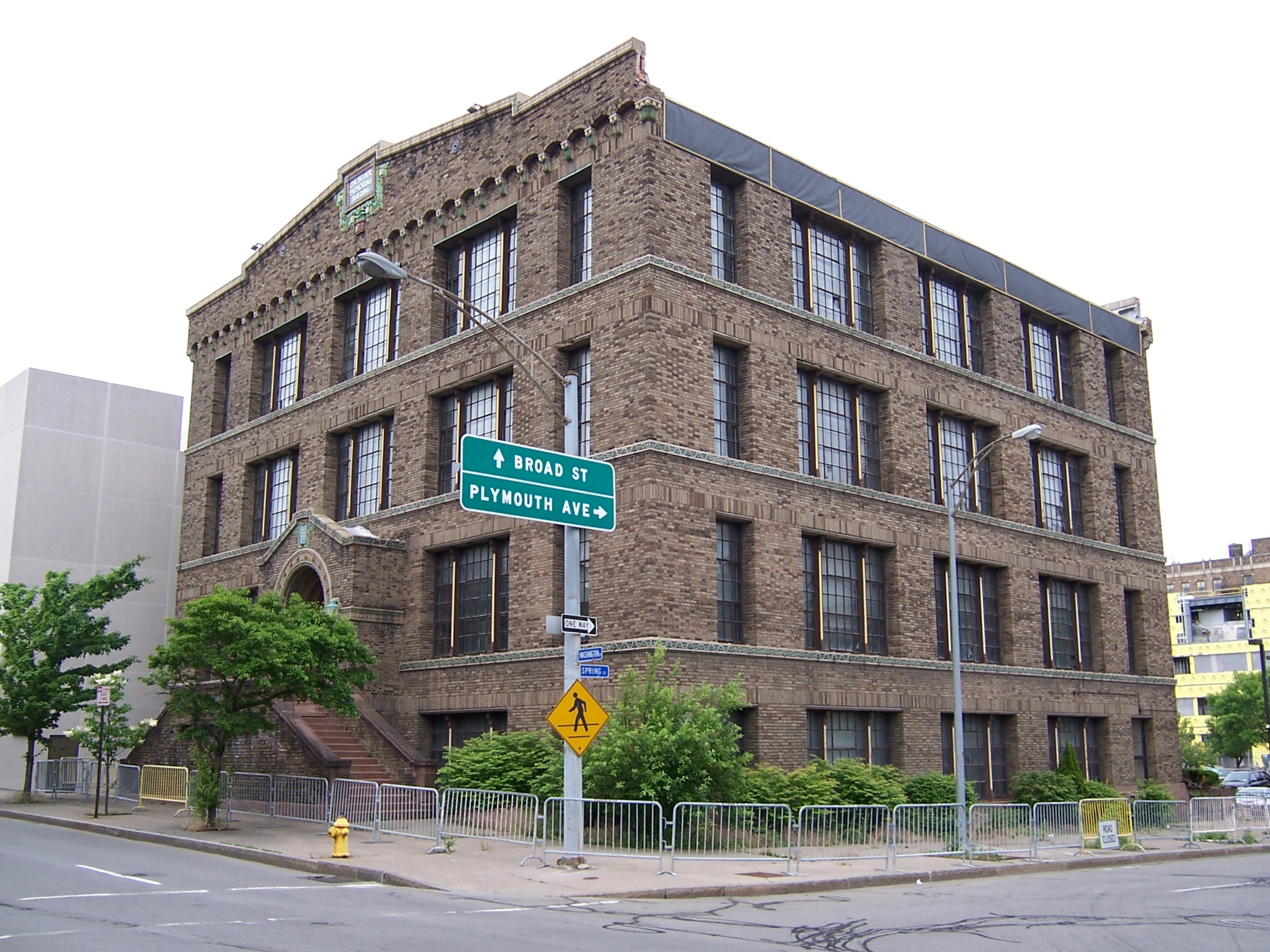
- The Bevier Memorial Building, barricaded, in June 2010

- Location within New York Location within the United States
- Location: Washington St., Rochester, New York
- Coordinates: 43°9′12″N 77°36′59″W
- Area: less than one acre
- Built: 1910
- Architect: Bragdon, Claude
- NRHP reference No.: 73001201
- Added to NRHP: October 25, 1973

Bevier Memorial Building is a historic institutional building built originally for the Rochester Athenæum and Mechanics Institute located at Rochester in Monroe County, New York. It is a three and a half brick story with ceramic trim designed by Claude Fayette Bragdon and completed in 1910.

The building's namesake Susan Bevier (1821-1903), widow of Henry H. Bevier, a wealthy brewer, gifted the Institute approximately $275,000 for its construction in her will.

It was listed on the National Register of Historic Places in 1973.
