= Robert Hope-Jones =

English musician and inventor

- Born: 9 February 1859; Hooton, Cheshire, United Kingdom
- Died: 13 September 1914 (aged 55); Rochester, New York, United States
- Education: Birkenhead School
- Occupations: musician, organ builder
- Known for: inventor of the theatre organ, innovations into electric-organ construction and helped influence American organ development.
- Spouse: Cecil Laurence (m. 1895)

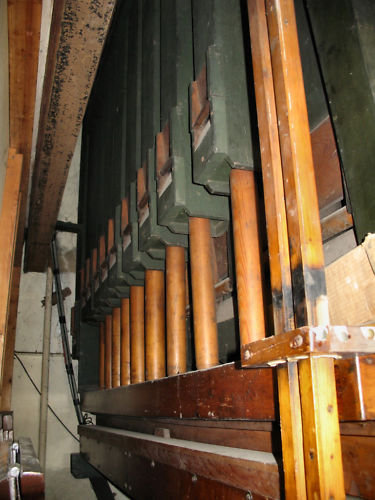
Hope-Jones 16 ft open wood pipes prior to removal from All Saints' Church, Upper Norwood

Robert Hope-Jones (9 February 1859 – 13 September 1914) was an English musician who is considered to be the inventor of the theatre organ in the early 20th century. He thought that a pipe organ should be able to imitate the instruments of an orchestra, and that the console should be detachable from the organ.

== Early life ==
Jones was born in Hooton, Cheshire, one of nine children of William and Agnes Hope-Jones. His younger brother was the horologist Frank Hope-Jones. He started learning the organ at an early age, and by the age of nine, he was playing for occasional services at St Mary's Church, Eastham. As a child, he was sickly and was privately tutored. He was sent to the South of France annually to improve his health. After his father's death, when he was about fourteen, he attended Birkenhead School for a couple of years.

When fifteen he became voluntary organist and choir-master to the Birkenhead School chapel. Two or three years later he simultaneously held a similar office at St Luke's Church, Tranmere, where he trained a boy choir that became widely celebrated. For this church he bought and set up a fine organ. He subsequently served as churchwarden and was active in many other church offices. He erected an organ in the Claughton Music Hall and organised and conducted oratorio performances in aid of various church funds, training a large voluntary chorus and orchestra for the purpose. For psalms, whose verses are arranged in groups of three, he wrote what he called "triple chants", a form of composition later adopted by other church writers; he also composed canticles, kyries and other music for the services of the church.

He became choirmaster and honorary organist of St John's Church, Birkenhead, doing similar work in connection with that institution. It was at this church and in connection with this organ that Hope-Jones did his first great work in connection with organ-building. The improved electric action, movable console and many other matters destined to startle the organ world, were devised and made by him there, after the day's business and the evening's choir rehearsals. He had voluntary help from choirmen and boys, who worked far into the night, certain of these men and boys later occupying positions with the Hope-Jones Organ Company.

After school, he was apprenticed to Laird's Shipbuilders in Birkenhead. After going through practical training in the various workshops and the drawing office, he then secured appointment as chief electrician of the Lancashire and Cheshire Telephone Company which became the National Telephone Company.

In connection with telephony he invented a multitude of improvements, some of which were later in universal use. About this time he devised a method for increasing the power of the human voice, through the application of a relay furnished with compressed air. The principle was later utilised in phonographs and other voice-producing machines. He also invented the diaphone, later used by the Canadian Government for its fog signal stations and, in a modified form, also adapted to the church organ.

About 1889, he resigned from the telephone company to devote himself to improving the church organ, a subject which had occupied much of his spare time for years. At first Hope-Jones licensed a score of organ-builders to carry out his inventions, but as this proved unsatisfactory, he entered the field as an organ-builder himself, being supported by Thomas Threlfall, chairman of the Royal Academy of Music; J. Martin White, Member of Parliament, and other friends. By 1890, Hope-Jones had set himself up in business to build organs with electric action.

When he became a rival and a competitor to those who had previously profited from his inventions, they became hostile and abusive. For nearly twenty years he met concerted opposition – attacks in turn against his electrical knowledge, musical taste, voicing ability, financial standing, and personal character.

Hope-Jones built more than 100 church organs in the United Kingdom before emigrating to the United States. His very sudden removal to the United States was to avoid prosecution when his partner, Eustace Ingram, discovered him in flagrante delicto at the Hereford factory with a boy.

== Opposition and sabotage ==
In the year 1895, what was practically the first Hope-Jones electric organ sold was set up in St George's Church, Hanover Square, London. The furor it created was cut short by a fire, which destroyed the organ and damaged the tower of the church. With curious promptitude, attention was directed to "the danger of allowing amateurs to make crude efforts at organ-building in valuable and historic churches, and to the great risk of electric actions". Arson being more than suspected, the authorities of the church ordered from Hope-Jones a similar organ to take the place of the one destroyed.

About the same time, a gimlet was forced through the electric cable of a Hope-Jones organ at St Mary's Church, Hendon, London. Shortly afterwards the cable connecting the console with the Hope-Jones organ at Ormskirk Parish Church, Lancashire, was cut through. At St Modwen's, Burton upon Trent, sample pipes from each of his special stops were stolen.

At the Auditorium, Ocean Grove, New Jersey, an effort was made to cripple the new Hope-Jones organ, shortly before one of the opening recitals in 1908. In the same year, on the Sunday previous to Edwin Lemare's recital on the Hope-Jones organ in the First Universalist Church, Rochester, New York, serious damage was done to some of the pipes in almost each stop in the organ.

== Organbuilding innovations ==
His organ at St John's Church, Birkenhead, became famous. It was visited by music lovers from all parts of the world. Organs built on the St John's model were ordered for the United States (Taunton, Mass., and Baltimore, Maryland), for India, Australia, New Zealand, Newfoundland, France, Germany, Malta, and for numbers of English cathedrals, churches, town halls, etc. Nothing whatever was spent on advertisement. The English musical press for years devoted columns to somewhat heated discussion of Hope-Jones' inventions, and echoes appeared in the musical periodicals of the US and other countries.

Among his innovations in the field of organ design were improvements to electro-pneumatic action and the invention of such stops as the Diaphone and the modern Tibia Clausa with its strong 8-foot (2.4 m) flute tone. The Tibia eventually became a staple of theatre organs. The thunderous 32-foot (9.8 m) Diaphone was less successful, but made an impression on audiences of the era.

Hope-Jones organs were also noted for such innovations as stoptabs instead of drawknobs, and very high wind pressures of 10–50 in (250–1,270 mm) to imitate orchestral instruments. He used expression liberally, sometimes enclosing the entire organ behind thick swell shades for great expressive power. He also used a system of unification which multiplied considerably the number of stops relative to the number of ranks.

With a background in telephone engineering, Hope-Jones brought electrification of the organ to a degree of refinement, first applying many of his ideas to instruments intended for churches or concert halls. The concept of unification in organ design involves applying couplers, often at three or four pitches, to an individual rank of pipes. By extending the compass of a rank from the customary 61 pipes (one for each manual key) to 85 or 97 (thus adding an octave below unison pitch and one or two octaves above), and supplying the necessary relays and wiring, the builder of an electrified (often, more precisely, electropneumatic) organ could multiply the tonal resources of the instrument severalfold without adding more ranks of pipes. Mutation stops such as the octave fifth (at an interval of a twelfth) and the superoctave third (seventeenth) could be derived from the same rank with equal facility.

A single 97-pipe extended rank, playable at each of four pitches on each of three manuals and at three pitches on the pedal, would thus be represented on the console by no fewer than fifteen stop tabs. Herein lies the secret of the "mighty" Wurlitzer. A Unit Orchestra with six ranks (diapason, flute, string, trumpet, vox humana, clarinet) might have more stops at the console than a traditional concert instrument of one hundred ranks.

Hope-Jones's contributions to organ design were not limited to ingenious wiring schemes. He held numerous patents for innovations and improvements in various phases of organ design. He invented the familiar tongue-shaped stop tablets, the horseshoe-shaped stop rail, and double-touch (adding more assertive stops when a given key is depressed more deeply than usual), all of which became standard features of Wurlitzer and other theatre organs produced in the U.S. and abroad during the silent film era.

He is also credited with inventing or developing several voices, including some that are unique to theatre-organ sound, such as the tibia clausa, a large-scaled stopped flute typically played with extreme tremolo; the diaphone, a powerful bass stop with a moving valve-like resonator in the mouth of each pipe; and close imitations of several orchestral instruments.

Other features characteristic of the theatre organ in which Hope-Jones played a pioneering role were the installation of various sets of pipes in separate recesses below or adjacent to the stage, thus achieving a primitive stereophonic effect; the placement of all divisions under expression, that is, enclosing all pipes in sound-tight boxes (often built of concrete) with pedal-controlled shutters, permitting wide variations in loudness; richer and deeper tremolo effects than were customary in church or concert instruments; high-powered centrifugal blowers capable of providing adequate wind for pipes voiced at 10 or more inches of water; tuned percussions such as marimba, xylophone, harp, glockenspiel, and cathedral chimes; bass, kettle, and snare drums, gongs, tambourine, castanets, and cymbals; "toy counter" effects for use in accompanying silent films, including doorbell, bird call, auto horn, sleigh bells, train whistle, thunder, and galloping hooves; and even a grand piano.

== United States ==
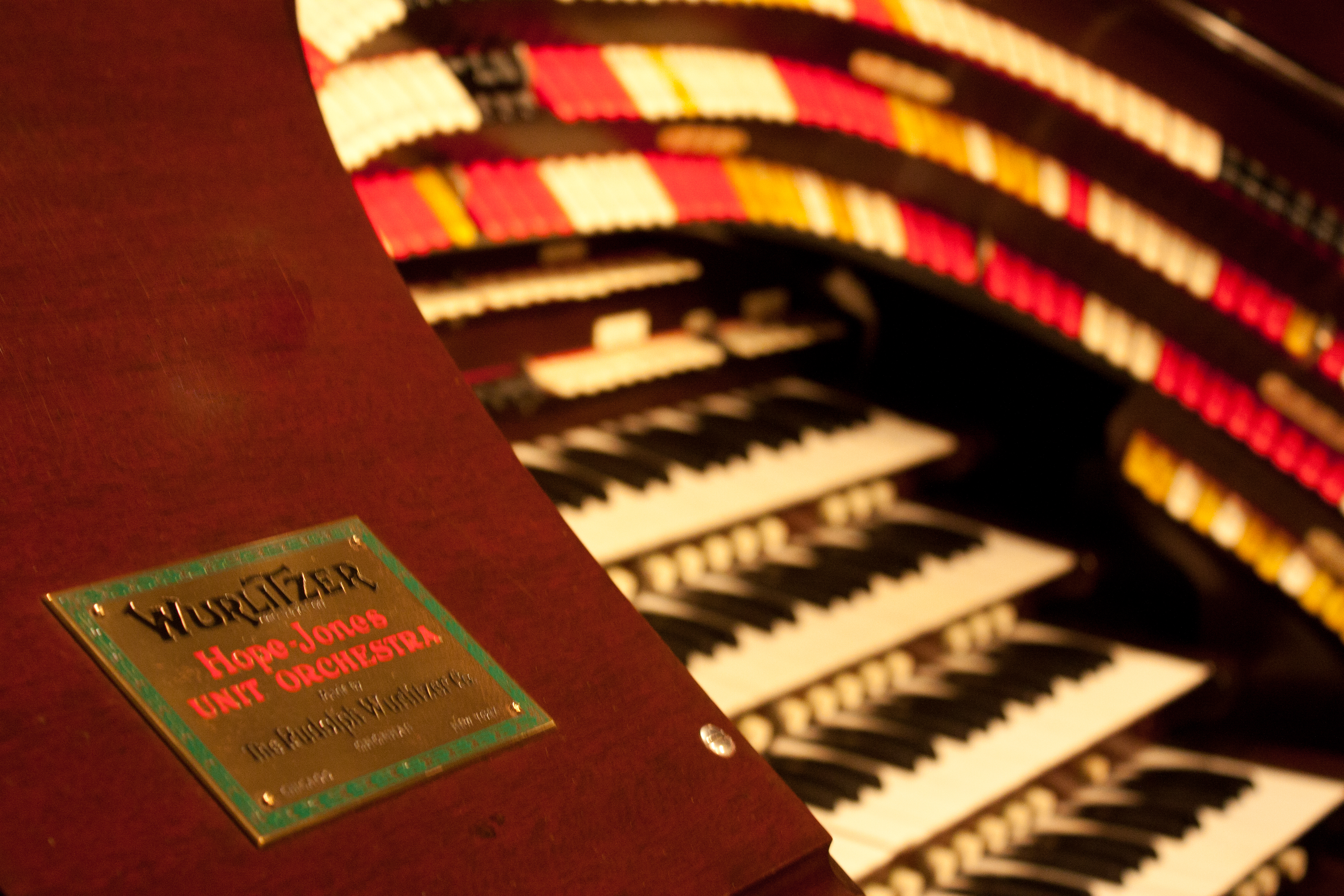
Wurlitzer Hope-Jones Unit Orchestra plate, Nethercutt Collection

In the spring of 1903, Hope-Jones visited the United States. At the instigation of R. P. Elliot, the organiser, vice-president and secretary of the Austin Organ Company of Hartford, Conn., Hope-Jones decided to remain in the US and join that corporation, taking the office of vice-president.

Subsequently a new firm, Hope-Jones & Harrison, was tentatively formed in Bloomfield, New Jersey, in July 1904; but as sufficient capital could not be obtained, in 1905 Hope-Jones and his corps of skilled employees joined the Ernest M. Skinner Company, of Boston, Hope-Jones taking the office of vice-president. Working in connection with the Skinner Company, Hope-Jones constructed and placed a fine organ in Park Church, Elmira, New York, erected in memory of Thomas K. Beecher. He there met Jervis Langdon, treasurer of the Elmira Chamber of Commerce, who secured the industry for his city by organizing a corporation to build exclusively Hope-Jones organs.

This "Hope-Jones Organ Company" was established in February 1907, the year of a financial panic. It failed to secure the capital it sought and was seriously embarrassed throughout its three years' existence. It built about forty organs, the best known being the one erected in the great auditorium at Ocean Grove, New Jersey.

In early 1908, Hope-Jones was arrested upon complaint of the mother of a boy, age 15, who worked at the organ factory and was molested. Hope-Jones subsequently paid the $500 fine with company money which deterred future investment and led to the firm's demise.

The patents and plant of the Elmira concern were acquired by the Rudolph Wurlitzer Company in April 1910, and Hope-Jones entered its employ, with headquarters at its mammoth factory at North Tonawanda, New York, continuing to carry on the business under his own name. Hope-Jones was a poor businessman and tended to operate his affairs without regard to profitability. The Wurlitzers took a very dim view of this and eventually forced him to work outside the factory when he became disagreeable. They had him bound by a contract and were fearful of his working for other firms if he was terminated.

He built 246 organs between 1887 and 1911 and his company employed 112 workers at its peak.

== Marriage ==
In August 1895 in St Nicholas's Church, Leeds, Kent, England, Hope-Jones married Cecil Laurence, a musical member of one of the leading families of Maidstone. Her father was William Laurence, JP of Hollingbourne.

== Death ==
In 1914, Hope-Jones committed suicide, age 55, by inhaling gas fumes in a hotel in Rochester, New York, some months after leaving the Wurlitzer company. He had written a suicide note stating that he had legal trouble and that a suit was pending. This however was not the case and as a result the coroner declared his death "suicide while insane". He is buried in Elmlawn Cemetery, Kenmore, Erie County, New York. Some have claimed that there were children or least two daughters. However the 1910 United States Census shows no family members other than the wife. Likewise, the 1903 immigration records show none.

== Legacy ==
Few Hope-Jones organs have survived to the present time. Probably the largest and most complete example in the UK was the partially restored 1901 organ at Battersea Old Town Hall, now the home of Battersea Arts Centre, but much of the instrument was destroyed in a fire in 2015. The organ at the Great Auditorium in Ocean Grove, New Jersey, built by Hope-Jones in 1908, has most of its original Hope-Jones ranks still intact and playable, although it has been vastly enlarged since then. Another fully preserved Hope Jones organ is his Opus 2 at the First Universalist Church in Rochester, New York, which has been described as sounding "weighty and lush", with large-scaled 8-foot (2.4 m) stops. The Anglican Cathedral of St John The Baptist, St John's, Newfoundland is home to the one of only two Hope-Jones organs ever installed in Canada (built in 1904); the organ was rebuilt by Casavant Frères in 1927, however many original components remain. The other Canadian organ was that of Vancouver's Christ Church Cathedral of 1911, replaced by a Casavant in the 1940s.

All Saints' Church, Upper Norwood, had an interesting example of a three-manual Hope-Jones organ within a parish church setting, complete with diaphones and Wurlitzer-style console. It was hoped that it might be restored at some point in the future, but the organ has now been dismantled. The historic Hope-Jones 16-foot (4.9 m) open wood rank complete with chest from All Saints' Church was moved in February 2011 to West Ashling Chapel belonging to The Clock Trust, where it was on public display with many other Hope-Jones pipes from this organ.

There is also part of the great organ in Worcester Cathedral in England. In recent work, only one Hope-Jones rank of pipes Viol d'Orchestre has been retained. As long ago as the early 1970s, the diaphones, solo division, and orchestral oboe were removed.

There are 1898 Hope-Jones organs, both subsequently greatly extended, in the Church of St Mary the Virgin, Pilton, Barnstaple, Devon and St Mary's Church, Ambleside, Cumbria.

Hope-Jones was the subject of an episode titled "Robert Hope-Jones and his Wurlitzer" from the 1990 cable television series Invention! on the Discovery Channel.

In 2014, a scrapbook of newspaper cuttings and letters, which had been the property of Hope-Jones, was donated to the Theatre Organ Heritage Centre of the Lancastrian Theatre Organ Trust in Eccles, Greater Manchester. The 190-page book was compiled by Hope-Jones and his company secretaries, Arthur Speed and Alfred Foxworthy, and contains many annotations by Hope-Jones himself. The book is being indexed by the Trust and it is hoped that a book will be published. The scrapbook has been added to many other Hope-Jones related items in the Heritage Centre.
