= Tibia Clausa =

A Tibia Clausa is a type of pipe organ pipe. It is a large-scale, stopped wood flute pipe, usually with a leathered lip. The rank was invented by Robert Hope-Jones. Tibia Clausas provides the basic foundation tone of the organ with few overtones or harmonics. The Tibia Clausa is arguably the most important rank of pipes in a theatre pipe organ, with some organs having as many as 5. The stop shares similarities with the Bourdon and the Gedackt found in some church pipe organs. In the 18th and 19th centuries, Tibia Clausa was sometimes used as an alternate name for Doppelflöte. Most tibias are made from wood, as by Wurlitzer etc., although examples of metal tibias may be found made by the John Compton Organ Company.

The Tibia Clausa, or Tibia, is generally found at 16 ft (4.9 m), 8 ft (2.4 m), 4 ft (1.2 m), and 2 ft (0.61 m) pitches as a unified rank. The mutation ranks Tibia Quint 5 1/3 ft (1.6 m), Twelfth 2 2/3 ft (0.81 m) and Tierce 1 3/5 ft (0.49 m) are also drawn from this unified rank of 97 pipes. In some larger organs, a second Tibia rank may be present, extended to 1 ft (0.30 m) instead of 16 ft (4.9 m), allowing a 1 1/3 ft (0.41 m) Nineteenth mutation and a 1 ft (0.30 m) Piccolo to be drawn from this rank. A few of the largest theatre organs, and some church organs, may have a separate 32 ft (9.8 m) Tibia Clausa rank of 12 pipes. In smaller organs, a Bourdon or Stopped Diapason may be substituted for a Tibia Clausa at 16 ft (4.9 m) pitch.

The Tibia may be voiced on wind pressures from 10 to 25 in (250 to 640 mm) . The Tibia is often used as a chorus stop (several footages played simultaneously, such as 16, 8, 4, and 2 ft, usually with tremulant; although it is also used as a solo stop in quieter or more reflective musical passages.

Other variants of the Tibia include: Tibia Bass, Tibia Flute, Tibia Major, Tibia Minor, Tibia Plena (open tibia) and Tibia Rex.
