= Emerson Lewis Richards =

American politician and attorney

Member of the New Jersey Senate from Atlantic County
- In office 1917–1918
- Preceded by: Walter Evans Edge
- Succeeded by: Charles D. White (1920)
- In office 1923–1935
- Preceded by: Charles D. White
- Succeeded by: William H. Smathers

Personal details
- Born: Emerson L. Richards; July 9, 1884 Atlantic City, New Jersey
- Died: October 21, 1963 (aged 79)
- Party: Republican

Emerson Lewis Richards (July 9, 1884 – October 21, 1963), an attorney, was a Republican New Jersey State Senator from Atlantic City.

== Biography ==
Richards was born on July 9, 1884, in Atlantic City, New Jersey. He was a state senator for Atlantic County. As President of the New Jersey Senate, Richards also served as the acting Governor of New Jersey in 1933 during the tenure of Arthur Harry Moore.

Richards was also a designer of pipe organs. He created the specifications for the Boardwalk Hall Auditorium Organ, which was the largest pipe organ in the world, in collaboration with Seibert Losh of the Midmer-Losh Organ Company. He also designed the organ at the Atlantic City High School.

Political offices
Preceded by A. Crozer Reeves	President of the New Jersey Senate; 1933	Succeeded by Clifford Ross Powell
