= Otto Strack =

American architect

Otto Strack (died 1935) was an architect in the United States. Several buildings he designed are listed on the National Register of Historic Places.

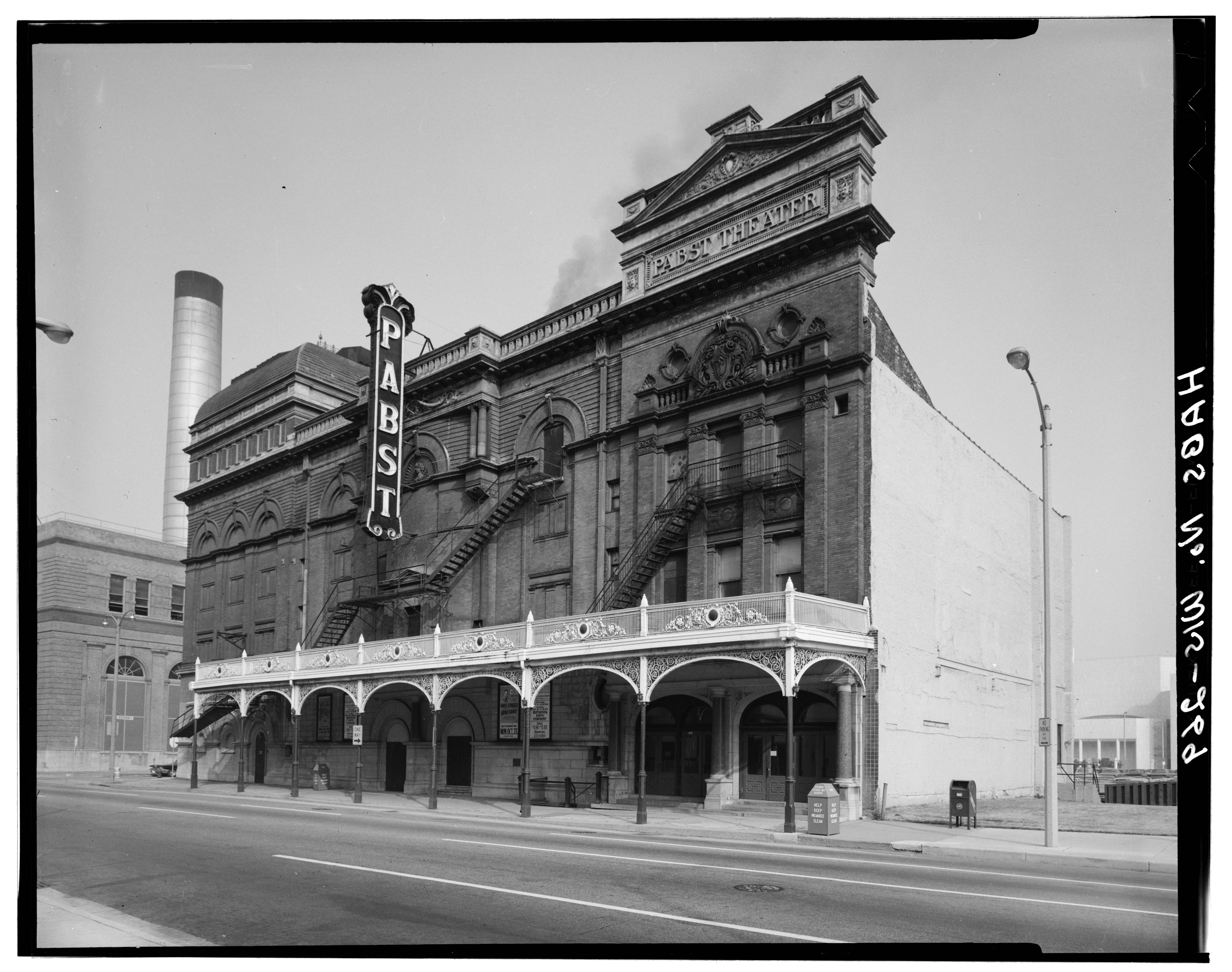
Pabst Theater

Strack was born in Germany, where he learned carpentry, masonry and blacksmithing. Then he studied architecture at the Berlin and Vienna polytechnical schools. In 1881, he came to the U.S. and settled in Chicago. In 1888, he moved to Milwaukee and became supervising architect for the Pabst Brewery. During this time, he also designed buildings for other German industrial barons in Milwaukee, many of them in styles reminiscent of their homeland. Strack moved to New York around the turn of the century, but at his death one of his pupils observed, "much of the old-world charm of many older Milwaukee buildings was due to Strack's influence."

He was briefly president of the Midmer-Losh Organ Company, after Seibert Losh was dismissed from the company on May 21, 1932. During Strack's tenure, Midmer-Losh finished the Boardwalk Hall Auditorium Organ in Atlantic City, which remains the world's largest pipe organ,

== Work ==
- Villa Von Baumbach, at 754 Elkhart Lake Drive in Elkhart Lake, Wisconsin, Sheboygan County, NRHP listed

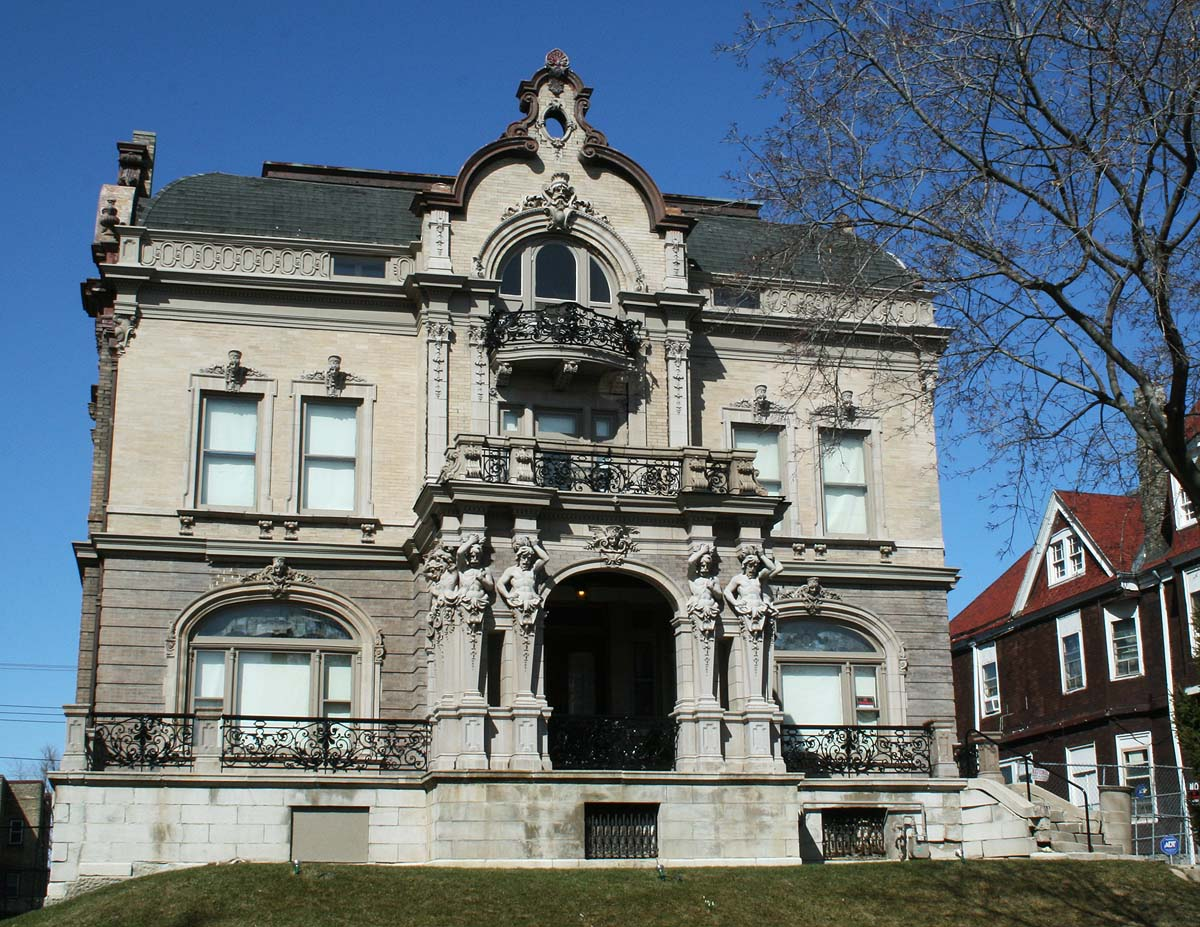
Joseph B. Kalvelage House

- Pabst Theater in Milwaukee, NRHP listed
- Joseph B. Kalvelage House at 2432 W. Kilbourn Avenue in Milwaukee, 1896-98, NRHP listed.
- Pabst Brewing Company Complex, NRHP listed (Charles Hoffmann also credited)
- One or more buildings in the Florida and Third Industrial Historic District in Milwaukee
- Bordens Dairy Factory in East New York
- E.W. Browning Company Building, 11 W. 17th St, Manhattan
