= Boardwalk Hall =

Indoor arena in Atlantic City, New Jersey, US

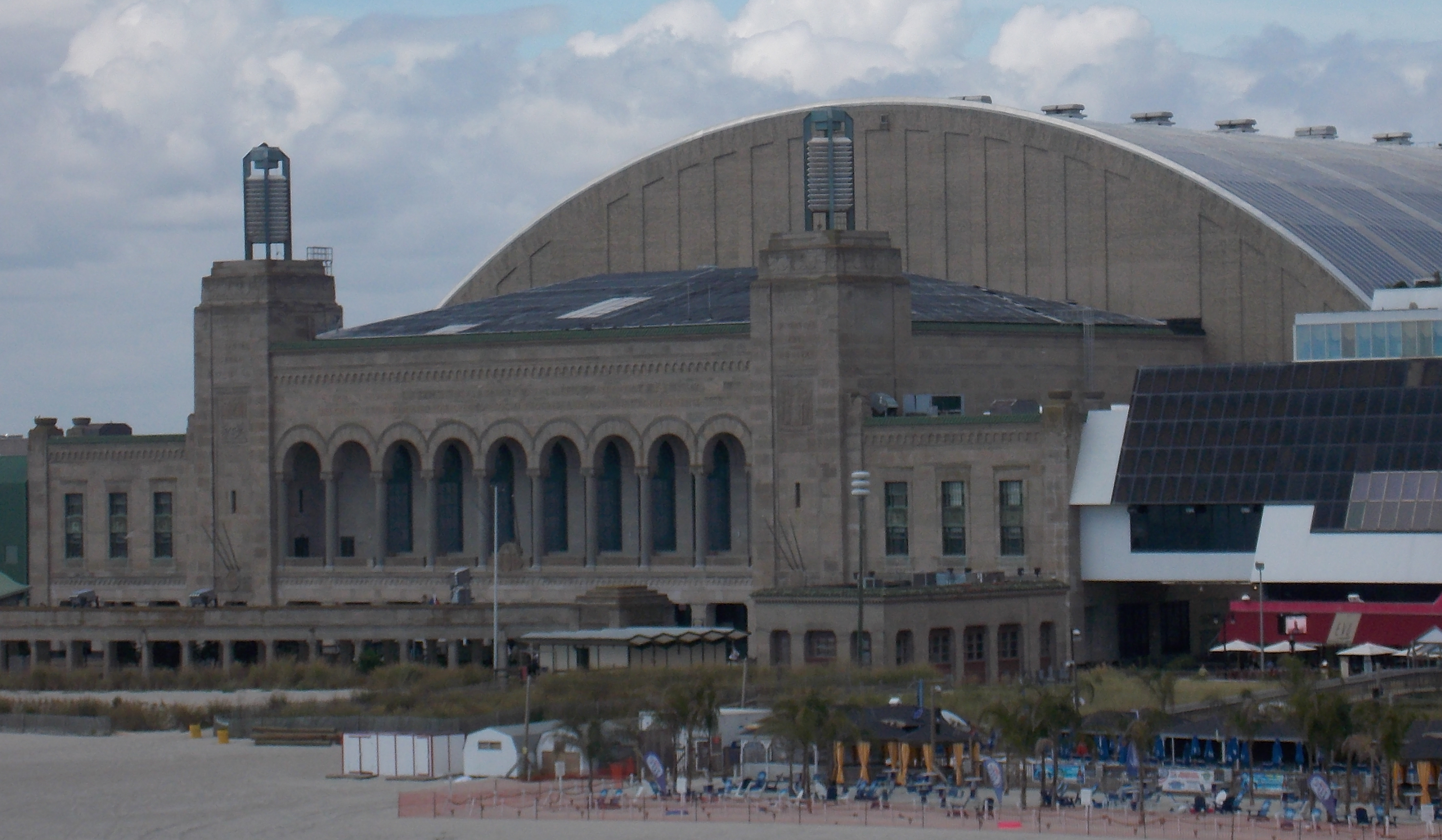
- Boardwalk Hall in 2014
- Interactive map of Boardwalk Hall
- Former names: Historic Atlantic City Convention Hall
- Address: 2301 Boardwalk
- Location: Atlantic City, New Jersey, U.S.
- Owner: Casino Reinvestment Development Authority
- Operator: Oak View Group
- Capacity: 14,770
- Public transit: NJ Transit bus: 505, 507, 508, 509 (at Atlantic Avenue)

Construction
- Opened: 1929

Tenants
- Atlantic City Seagulls (EAHL) (Note: The original Seagulls franchise played as an independent team from 1930–1932, in the TSHL from 1932–1933, and in the EAHL from 1933–1942.); 1930–1942; Atlantic City Seagulls (EAHL) (Note: The second iteration of the Seagulls played in the EAHL from 1947–1952. This team is identified as a separate entity according to league history.); 1947–1952; Boardwalk Bowl (NCAA); 1961–1973; Liberty Bowl (NCAA); 1964; Knute Rockne Bowl (NCAA); 1970–1972; Atlantic City Seagulls (USBL); 1996–2001; Atlantic City Boardwalk Bullies (ECHL); 2001–2005; Atlantic City CardSharks (NIFL); 2004; Atlantic 10 Men's Basketball Tournament (NCAA); 2007–2012; ECAC Men’s Ice Hockey Tournament (NCAA); 2011–2013; Atlantic City Blackjacks (AFL); 2019; Metro Conference Men’s Basketball Tournament (NCAA); 2021–present Metro Conference Women’s Basketball Tournament (NCAA); 2021–present

Website
- boardwalkhall.com
- Boardwalk Hall
- U.S. National Register of Historic Places
- U.S. National Historic Landmark
- New Jersey Register of Historic Places
- Location within Atlantic County, New Jersey
- Coordinates: 39°21′18″N 74°26′19″W
- Built: 1926
- Architect: Lockwood, Greene & Co.
- Architectural style: Romanesque revival
- NRHP reference No.: 87000814
- NJRHP No.: 390

Significant dates
- Added to NRHP: February 27, 1987
- Designated NHL: February 27, 1987
- Designated NJRHP: March 2, 1993

Jim Whelan Boardwalk Hall, formerly known as the Historic Atlantic City Convention Hall, is a multi-purpose indoor arena in Atlantic City, New Jersey. Built from 1926 to 1929, it was Atlantic City's primary convention center until the opening of the new Atlantic City Convention Center in 1997. Boardwalk Hall was declared a U.S. National Historic Landmark in 1987 as one of the few surviving buildings from the city's early heyday as a seaside resort.

Boardwalk Hall seats 14,770 people at maximum capacity, while accommodating a reduced capacity of 10,500 for ice hockey.

The venue contains the world's largest musical instrument, a pipe organ with over 33,000 pipes, eight chambers, the world's largest console with seven manuals and over 1200 stop tabs, and one of two 64-foot (20 m) stops (the other found in the Sydney Town Hall). Also included in this organ are pipes operating on 100 inches of pressure, the Grand Ophicleide being the loudest and also most famous. The Guinness Book of World Records noted "a pure trumpet note of ear-splitting volume, six times louder than the loudest train whistle." However, these stops are actually well-refined and are not overpowering in Boardwalk Hall due to its huge interior.

In 2018, New Jersey approved legislation to dedicate Atlantic City's Boardwalk Hall in honor of Jim Whelan, a former mayor and state senator who died in 2017. The hall's Adrian Phillips Theater is named for a former president of the Miss America Organization.

The Miss America Pageant, founded in 1921 in Atlantic City, was held at Boardwalk Hall from 1940 until 2004. The Pageant returned to the hall in 2013 and was last used for Miss America 2019.

Boardwalk Hall hosted the August 1964 Democratic National Convention that nominated U.S. President Lyndon B. Johnson as the Democratic Party's candidate for the 1964 U.S. presidential election, nine months after the assassination of his predecessor, John F. Kennedy, in November 1963.

Stockton University currently utilizes Boardwalk Hall for undergraduate degree recipient ceremonies each year in May.

== History and design ==
Edward L. Bader, mayor of Atlantic City from 1924 to 1927, led the initiative to acquire the land for Convention Hall, now Boardwalk Hall, and construction was underway at the time of his death. The hall, designed by the architectural firm Lockwood Greene, was built during 1926–1929.

The main hall measures 456 by 310 feet (139 by 94 m). The barrel vault ceiling is 137 feet (42 m) high. Ten pairs of three-hinged steel trusses support this unusually large clear span; there are no supporting columns. Each pair of trusses spans 350 feet (110 m) and weighs 220 short tons (200 t). The trusses are tied to the frame columns to allow the building to flex slightly with wind and ground pressure. The barrel ceiling consists of painted aluminum tiles. It is decorated to resemble Roman bath tiles, and extends over 196,000 square feet (18,200 m^{2}). The building's forward section is slightly rotated to align with the boardwalk, while the hall itself is aligned to the street grid.

It takes sound roughly 0.4 seconds to travel the length of the hall; because of this, the pipe organ chambers could not be built more than halfway back from the stage or a noticeable delay would occur. This led to two of the organ's chambers being placed in the upper shell of the building, in the space between the outer roof and the ceiling.

A $90-million renovation designed by EwingCole was completed in 2001 and received several awards, including a 2003 National Trust for Historic Preservation Award and Building magazine's 2002 Modernization Award. The hall's organ, which is the world's biggest, was severely damaged in the process.

== Concerts ==
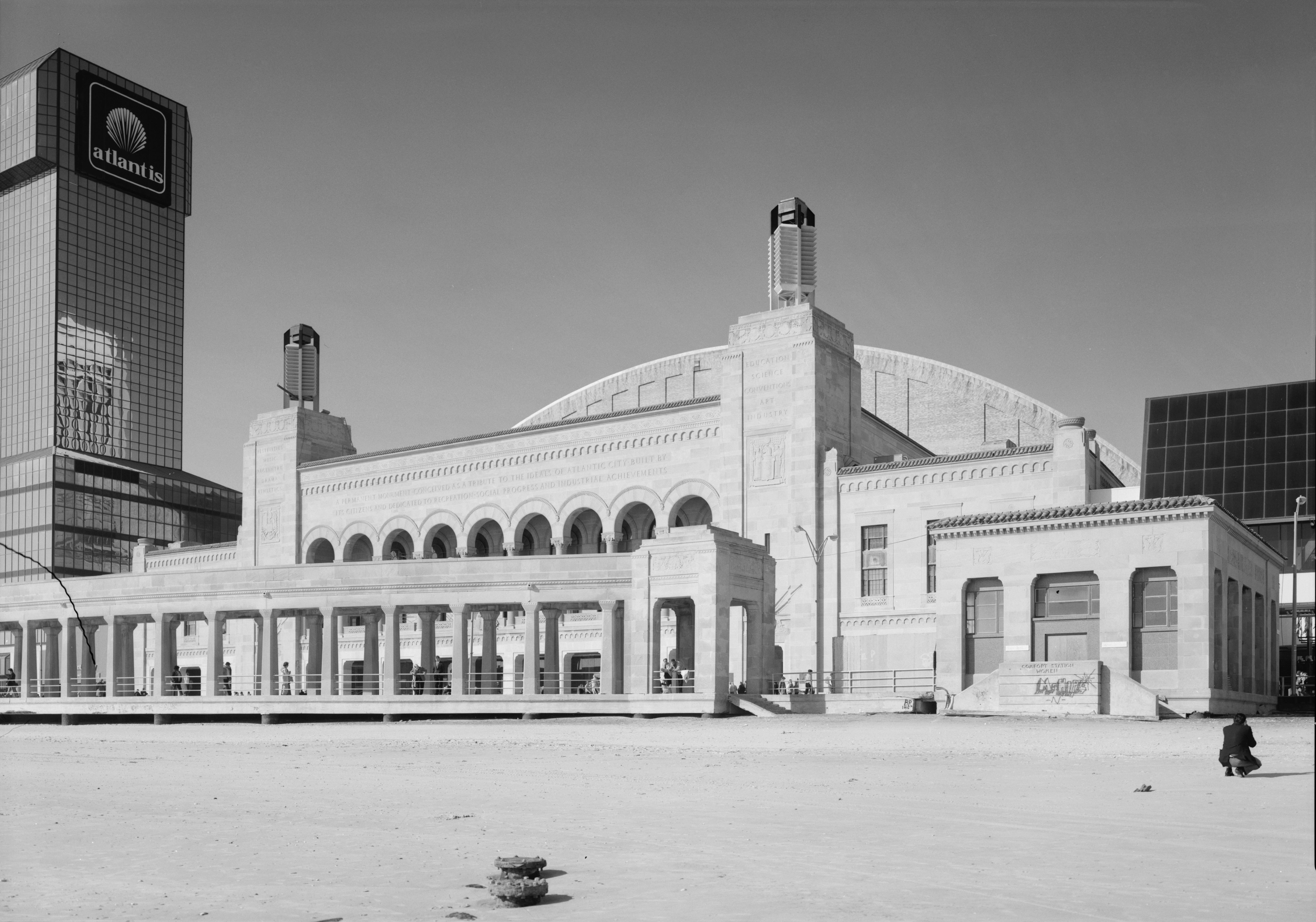
Boardwalk Hall in 1992

Judy Garland gave a concert at Convention Hall on August 4, 1961. Garland returned for a second engagement on September 3, 1961.

In August 1964, the Beatles held one of their largest concerts on their first U.S. tour at the hall.

The hall was also the venue for the concert by the Rolling Stones on their Steel Wheels Tour in 1989. The concert, which was shown on pay-per-view television, is widely remembered by fans for a mishap where viewers were cut off from the performance during the song "(I Can't Get No) Satisfaction", as well as the performance of "Miss You" in some countries. This concert was remastered, remixed, and released on DVD, Blu-Ray, CD and Vinyl on 2 October 2020, as Steel Wheels Live Atlantic City, New Jersey '89.

Britney Spears performed a sold-out show in December 2001, July 2002 and again for her Femme Fatale Tour on August 6, 2011.

On March 7, 2003, Bruce Springsteen and the E Street Band performed. Tickets for the event were immediately sold out. Springsteen returned to perform a solo show on his Devils & Dust Tour on November 13, 2005.

On August 16, 2003, Justin Timberlake and Christina Aguilera were supposed to perform at the Boardwalk Hall, but due to a major stage collapse, the show (and later tour) was postponed.

On February 4, 2006, Bon Jovi from New Jersey performed for the Have a Nice Day Tour.

Celine Dion performed a sold-out show on September 20, 2008, as part of her Taking Chances World Tour. Dion returned to the venue for another sold-out show with her Courage World Tour on February 22, 2020.

Phish played three nights at Boardwalk Hall for Halloween in both 2010 and 2013. The 2010 Halloween concert featured a performance of Little Feat's Waiting For Columbus album in its entirety. The 2013 show included the debut of Phish's unrecorded album Wingsuit, which would later become the album Fuego. Phish returned to Boardwalk Hall for three nights in early October 2026.

Jennifer Lopez performed a sold-out show in front of 11,220 people during her Dance Again World Tour on July 29, 2012,

American pop star Madonna performed at the venue four times, with the first sold-out show at the arena in front of 12,322 people during her Confessions Tour on July 16, 2006. She performed the second show in front of 13,293 people during her Sticky & Sweet Tour on November 22, 2008, and the third show in front of 12,207 people during the MDNA Tour on September 15, 2012. The fourth and last performance came in front of 9,498 people during her Rebel Heart Tour on October 3, 2015.

Lady Gaga was scheduled to perform here on March 2, 2013, for her Born This Way Ball, but the show was later cancelled due to a hip injury which required surgery. She has previously performed at the arena on July 4, 2010, and February 19, 2011, as a part of her Monster Ball Tour. She performed a sold-out show on June 28, 2014, for her Artrave: The Artpop Ball Tour.

Beyoncé performed at the venue for the first time on the Mrs. Carter Show World Tour. The show sold out within its first few days of sales and took place on July 26, 2013.

On August 4, 2013, Journey and Rascal Flatts made a stop at the hall for one-night shows, performing separately.

On May 22, 2015, the Who stopped at the Hall to celebrate their 50th anniversary on their tour, The Who Hits 50!

On June 8, 2019, Twenty One Pilots performed at the hall for their Bandito Tour.

On June 9, 2023, Gavin DeGraw headlined with Colbie Caillat for a show with North2Shore.

== Sporting events ==
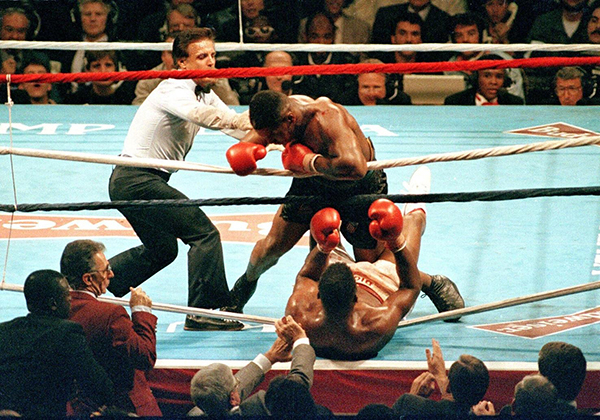
Mike Tyson knocks down Tyrell Biggs in the seventh round of their championship fight at Convention Hall in 1987.

=== Boxing ===
Mike Tyson fought in Boardwalk Hall several times as heavyweight champion, including four of his seven defenses as undisputed champion. Among his title defenses in Boardwalk Hall was a fourth-round TKO over former champion Larry Holmes on January 22, 1988. His most famous bout at the venue was the 91-second knockout of former champion and previously undefeated Michael Spinks on June 27, 1988.

On April 19, 1991, undisputed heavyweight champion Evander Holyfield defeated former champion George Foreman in his first title defense.

Other fighters who have had boxing matches (many of which were title fights) in Boardwalk Hall include Sugar Ray Leonard, Oscar De La Hoya, Roberto Durán, Lennox Lewis, Roy Jones Jr., Floyd Mayweather Jr., Bernard Hopkins, Riddick Bowe, Julio César Chávez, Héctor Camacho, Micky Ward, and Arturo Gatti.

In September 2007, it was the venue for the Kelly Pavlik versus Jermain Taylor boxing match for the World Boxing Council, World Boxing Organization, and The Ring magazine's middleweight championships.

=== Mixed martial arts ===
The Ultimate Fighting Championship has held five events in the hall, UFC 41: Onslaught in 2003, UFC 50: The War of '04 in 2004, UFC 53: Heavy Hitters in 2005, UFC Fight Night: Barboza vs. Lee in 2018, and most recently UFC on ESPN: Blanchfield vs. Fiorot in 2024.

=== Professional wrestling ===
The Hall hosted the World Wrestling Federation's WrestleMania IV and V in 1988 and 1989, respectively, although on the television coverage it was referred to as Trump Plaza because the adjacent casino hotel was the primary sponsor. During the opening to WrestleMania IV, celebrity guest Bob Uecker referred to the building as the “Convention Center”. WrestleMania IV was attended by 18,165 fans while WrestleMania V had an attendance of 18,946. It was the only venue for 38 years to host the annual pay-per-view event in consecutive years until Allegiant Stadium in Paradise, Nevada hosted WrestleMania 41 and WrestleMania 42.

In addition to the two WrestleMania events, many other WWE shows have been held with their weekly shows Raw, SmackDown, Heat, Velocity, and ECW taking place. After a 20 year hiatus, WWE TV returned to Boardwalk Hall for Monday Night Raw on June 29, 2026. They also taped the July 3, 2026 episode of Friday Night SmackDown after Raw went off air. This was the first televised Smackdown since 2008.

The Hall hosted All Elite Wrestling on February 9, 2022, with an episode of AEW Dynamite. It also hosted the February 11, 2022 episode of AEW Rampage, which was taped on the same night as Dynamite.

=== Ice hockey ===
From 1930 to 1942, Boardwalk Hall served as the home arena of the Atlantic City Seagulls of the EAHL. In 1947, a second iteration of the Seagulls brought the league back to Atlantic City, playing in Boardwalk Hall until 1952.

Boardwalk Hall later served as the home arena for the Atlantic City Boardwalk Bullies of the ECHL from 2001 to 2005. The franchise won the 2003 Kelly Cup while based at the venue.

From 2011 to 2013, ECAC Hockey held its men's ice hockey tournament at Boardwalk Hall.

During the 2010–2011 season, Boardwalk Hall hosted four home games for the Albany Devils of the AHL and one home game for the Trenton Devils of the ECHL, both of which were affiliated with the New Jersey Devils. The Albany Devils returned to play four home games during the both 2012–13 and 2013–14 seasons. Despite not having a team in Atlantic City, the American Hockey League hosted the 2012 All-Star Classic at Boardwalk Hall.

On November 24, 2012, Boardwalk Hall hosted "Operation Hat Trick", a charity hockey game to raise money for Hurricane Sandy victims. Among the NHL players who participated were Martin Brodeur, Andy Greene, Henrik Lundqvist, Bobby Ryan, and James van Riemsdyk.

=== Basketball ===
The Syracuse Nationals and the Philadelphia Warriors played a regular season game at the arena on December 29, 1949. The game was part of a doubleheader. The opening game was an exhibition basketball game between selected players of the Philadelphia Eagles and the Washington Redskins.

From 2007 until 2012, the Atlantic 10 Conference held its annual men's basketball tournament at Boardwalk Hall.

The Brooklyn Nets and the Philadelphia 76ers played a preseason game at the arena on October 13, 2012.

In 2018, the Metro Atlantic Athletic Conference announced its men's and women's basketball tournaments would be held at Boardwalk Hall beginning in 2020.

Date	Opponent	Score	Home	Game type	Attendance
December 29, 1949	Syracuse Nationals	64–62	Philadelphia Warriors	RS	1,229
October 13, 2012	Brooklyn Nets	108–105	Philadelphia 76ers	PS	6,887

=== College football ===
The nation's first-ever indoor American football field was constructed within the hall in 1930, and hosted one to three games a year through the 1930s, before the practice was halted due to World War II and not resumed until 1961. The first game was a 7–0 victory by Washington & Jefferson over Lafayette on October 25, 1930.

==== Boardwalk Bowl ====
Boardwalk Hall was the home of the former Boardwalk Bowl game from 1961 to 1973. From 1961 through 1967, the games were known as the "Little Army-Navy Game", featuring the College Division's Pennsylvania Military College and the Merchant Marine Academy. From 1968 through 1972, the bowl served as the East regional championship for the College Division. The Delaware won four times, and Massachusetts won once. The final playing of the bowl was in 1973, as a Division II quarterfinal in which the Grambling defeated Delaware.

==== Liberty Bowl ====
In 1959, A. F. "Bud" Dudley, a former Villanova University athletic director, created the Liberty Bowl, an annual postseason college football bowl game in Philadelphia, Pennsylvania. The game was played at Philadelphia Municipal Stadium, but as the only cold-weather bowl game, it was plagued by poor attendance. A group of Atlantic City businessmen convinced Dudley to move his game from Philadelphia to Boardwalk Hall for 1964 and guaranteed Dudley $25,000.

The 1964 Liberty Bowl was the first major (University Division) collegiate bowl game played indoors and was also the first indoor football game broadcast nationwide on U.S. television. Since artificial turf was still in its developmental stages and was unavailable for the game, the hall was equipped with a four-inch-thick grass surface with two inches of burlap underneath it (as padding) on top of concrete. To keep the grass growing, artificial lighting was installed and kept on 24 hours a day. The entire process cost about $16,000. End zones were only eight yards long instead of the usual ten yards.

6,059 fans saw the Utah Utes rout the West Virginia Mountaineers, 32–6. Dudley was paid $25,000 from Atlantic City businessmen, $60,000 from ticket sales, and $95,000 from television revenues, for a $10,000 net profit. This would be the only time the game was played in Atlantic City, as Dudley moved it the following year to Memphis, Tennessee, where it remains to this day.

==== Knute Rockne Bowl ====
The Knute Rockne Bowl, a College Division game for smaller eastern schools, was held in Boardwalk Hall from 1970 through 1972. Montclair State (1970) and Bridgeport (1971, 1972) were the victors.

=== Indoor & arena football ===
In 2004, it was the home of the Atlantic City CardSharks, a professional indoor football team that played a single season in the National Indoor Football League.

On May 30, 2015, the venue hosted the Philadelphia Soul and Las Vegas Outlaws for the venue's first Arena Football League (AFL) game. The Soul won 51–43 in front of an attendance of 6,514.

In 2019, the AFL added the Atlantic City Blackjacks with home games at Boardwalk Hall. The AFL ceased operations at the end of the season.

=== Soccer ===
On December 12, 1965, the New York Ukrainians defeated the Philadelphia Ukrainian Nationals 3–2 in the first regulation indoor soccer game at the then Convention Hall before more than 3,000 spectators.

=== Tennis ===
In 1995, Boardwalk Hall was used for Monica Seles's return to tennis after she had been stabbed in 1993. It was a straight-sets victory over Martina Navratilova.

Boardwalk Hall was used in 1996 for the women's Fed Cup, in which the United States defeated Spain 5–0.

=== Cheerleading ===
Since the early 2000's, the hall has been used to host the annual Battle at the Boardwalk Grand Nationals for All Star cheerleading in late January.

=== Other sporting events ===
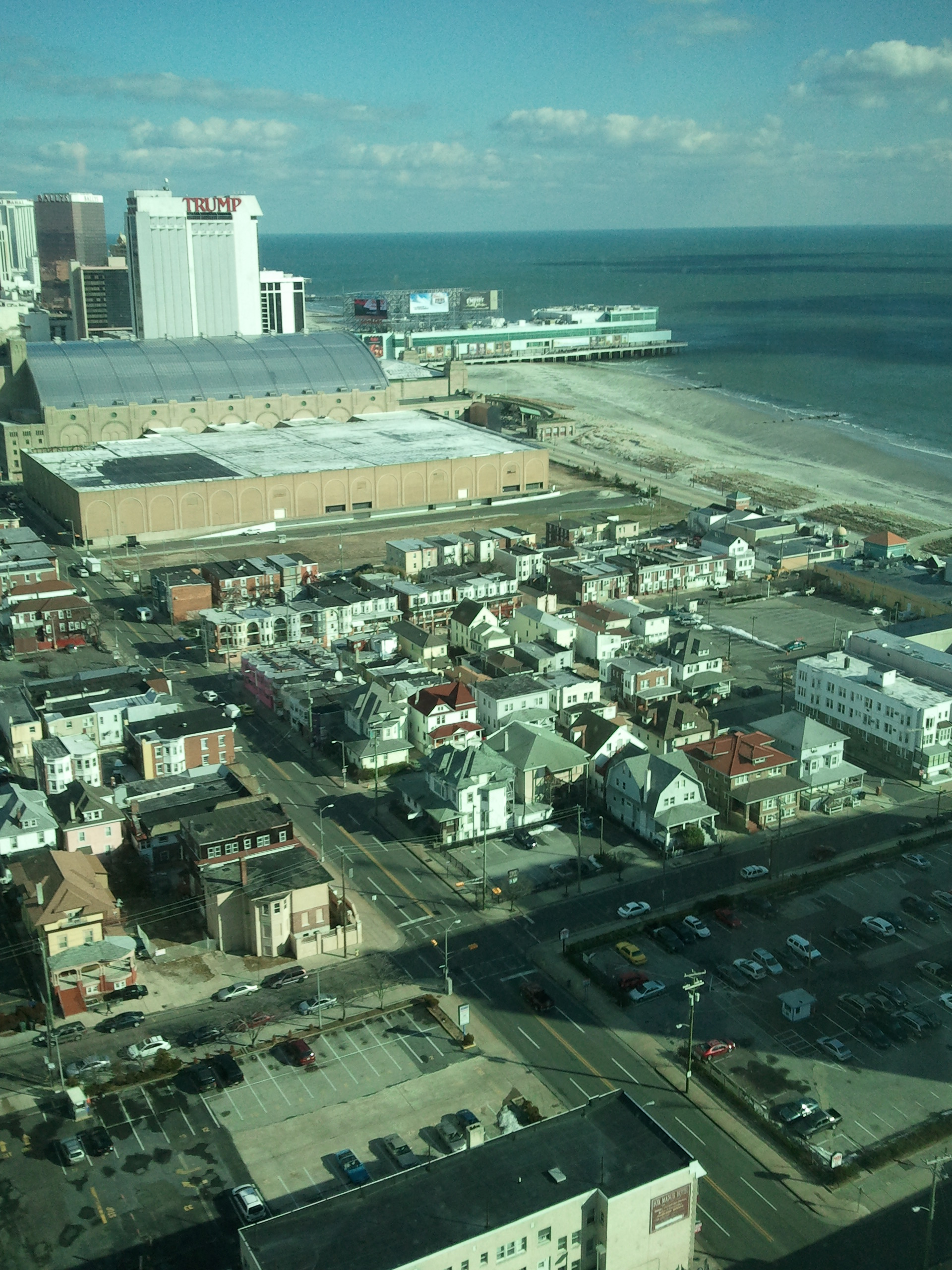
View of Atlantic City Boardwalk Hall and ocean, 2011

The New Jersey State Interscholastic Athletic Association uses the hall to host the annual individual state wrestling tournament.

Midget car racing events have been held at the Boardwalk Hall since 1938. Since 2003 it hosts the Atlantic City Indoor Races, a round of the Indoor Auto Racing Championship Series.

The PBR hosted a Built Ford Tough Series bull riding event at Boardwalk Hall during the 2003 and 2018 seasons.

The 2005 edition of the Skate America figure skating competition was held at Boardwalk Hall.

On August 1, 2025, the Professional Fighters League held its World Tournament Finals at Boardwalk Hall.

== Pipe organs ==
Constructed between May 1929 and December 1932, the Main Auditorium Organ is the "Poseidon" Midmer-Losh pipe organ, the world's largest, as listed in The Guinness Book of World Records. The instrument has an estimated 33,112 pipes and requires approximately 600 horsepower (450 kW) of blowers to operate. The organ was badly damaged by the 1944 Great Atlantic Hurricane and has not been fully functional since. It was rendered completely inoperable by carelessness during hall renovation in 2001, and remained unplayable until 2007, when a restoration program began. As of 2024, about 60% of the organ's functionality has been restored.

Boardwalk Hall's attached ballroom contains a 55-rank Kimball concert/theater pipe organ—originally installed to accompany silent movies—that was severely damaged during the hall's renovation. Though small in comparison with the Main Auditorium organ, the Ballroom organ is actually one of the largest theater organs by rank count, second to Radio City Music Hall's Wurlitzer theater organ (58 ranks).

Restoration efforts have been underway, originally overseen by the Atlantic City Convention Hall Organ Society and funded by private donations and federal Save America's Treasures grants. The work is overseen by the Historic Organ Restoration Committee, a 501(c)3 nonprofit chartered by the state of New Jersey for the restoration and preservation of the two pipe organs of Boardwalk Hall. As of January 2024, the committee forecast that at current rates of funding, restoration should be completed by 2030.

On October 4, 2026, Page McConnell of Phish became the first musician in the venue's history to use the pipe organ as part of a musical performance.

== Recognition ==
The convention center is one of the few buildings surviving from Atlantic City's heyday as a seaside resort in the 1920s. It was an architectural and engineering triumph, its convention space providing the largest interior space with an unobstructed view at the time. It was recognized for its engineering as a Historic Civil Engineering Landmark in 1983, and as a U.S. National Historic Landmark in 1987.

Billboard magazine recognized Boardwalk Hall as the top-grossing mid-sized arena in the U.S. in 2003 and 2004.

== See also ==
- List of New Jersey music venues by capacity
- Atlantic City Armory
- Atlantic City Convention Center
- National Register of Historic Places listings in Atlantic County, New Jersey

== External links and sources ==
- Official website
- Historic American Buildings Survey (HABS) No. NJ-1130, "Atlantic City Convention Hall, On Boardwalk, West of Mississippi Avenue, Atlantic City, Atlantic County, NJ"
- Image of Boardwalk Hall Auditorium Interior

Events and tenants
Preceded by None	Miss America Venue; 1940–2004	Succeeded by Theatre for the Performing Arts
Preceded by Philadelphia Municipal Stadium	Home of the Liberty Bowl; 1964	Succeeded by Liberty Bowl Memorial Stadium
Preceded by Theatre for the Performing Arts	Miss America Venue; 2013–2019	Succeeded by Mohegan Sun
