= Senator Reeves =

Senator Reeves may refer to:

- A. Crozer Reeves (1867–1936), New Jersey State Senate
- Bryce Reeves (born 1966), Virginia State Senate
- Eric Miller Reeves (born 1963), North Carolina State Senate
- Shane Reeves (born 1968), Tennessee State Senate
- Ted Reeves (1905–1988), Nebraska State Senate
