= Florida and Third Industrial Historic District =

Historic district in Wisconsin, United States

- U.S. National Register of Historic Places
- U.S. Historic district
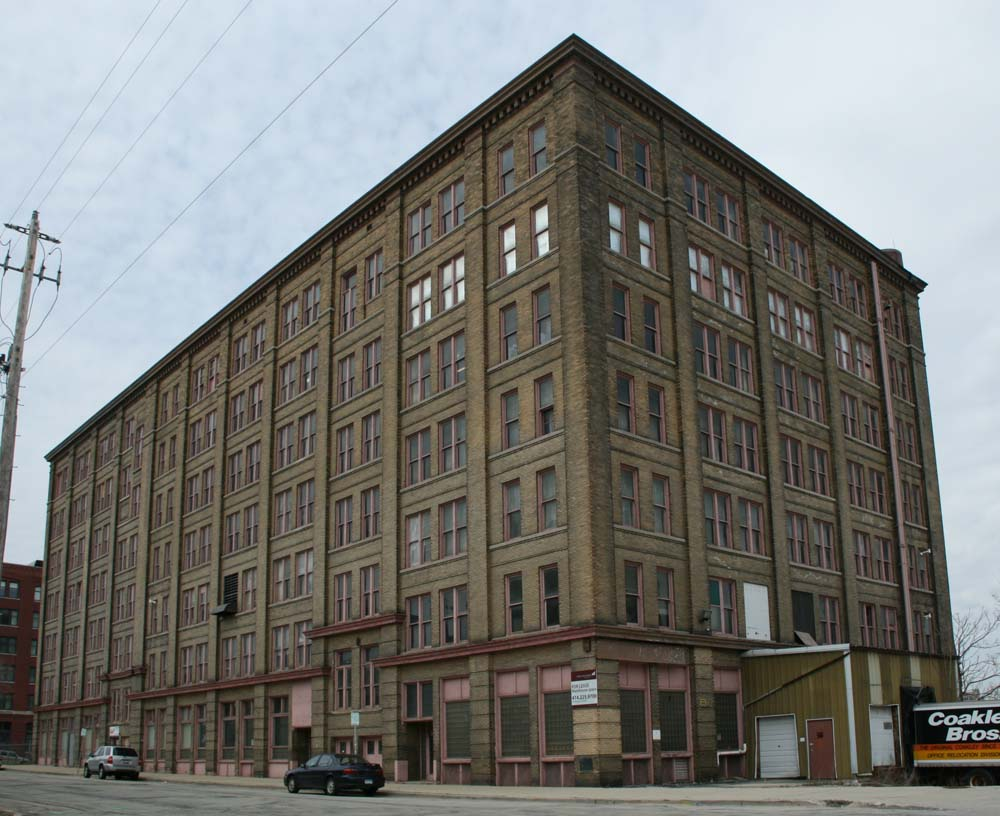
- George Ziegler Candy Co. in the Florida and Third Industrial Historic District

- Location within Wisconsin Location within the United States
- Location: Milwaukee, Wisconsin
- NRHP reference No.: 08000656
- Added to NRHP: July 10, 2008

The Florida and Third Industrial Historic District is a group of multistory industrial lofts built from 1891 to 1928 near the Soo Line rail-yard in Milwaukee, Wisconsin, United States. It was added to the National Register of Historic Places in 2008.

== History ==
Contributing buildings in the district were constructed from 1891 to 1928. Much of the district is adjacent to the Soo Line Railroad yard.

Buildings include, roughly in the order built:

- The Lindemann & Hoverson Company at 331 S. Third Street, built in 1891, is the oldest in the district. It was designed by Otto Strack in a style that is considered early textile mill industrial loft - five stories, timber-framed, brick clad, with architectural decoration on the narrow street-facing side. Though the building is in a style used in textile mills, the first occupant, Lindemann & Hoverson, manufactured gas stoves.
- The Heinn Looseleaf Ledger Company at 326 W. Florida Street is another textile mill industrial loft. This one was designed by Carl L. Linde and built in 1894, five stories, brick-clad, with Romanesque Revival styling, a corner turret, and a street-level storefront. It was built by Pabst as a rental property. Heinn moved in during 1907 and manufactured loose leaf notebooks there for 50 years.
- The Molitor Paper Box Company at 212 S. Third Street is a later building, considered a middle textile mill industrial loft because of its broader front. Again, it is timber-framed and clad in brick, seven stories. It was designed by Horsch Construction and Engineering and built in 1904.
- The Berger Bedding Company at 500 W. Florida Street is another industrial loft, designed by Buemming and Dick and built in 1907. It is six stories tall, with some pilasters decorated with Prairie Style stone capitals.
- The George Ziegler Candy Co. at 408 W. Florida Street (pictured above) is another middle textile mill industrial loft. This one is seven stories, designed by Herman Paul Schnetzky and built by Concrete Contractors and the Northwest Tile Company, with its first section built in 1908. The style is a stripped-down Neoclassical, with brick pilasters and a simple dentilated cornice. It has a concrete skeleton - probably one of the first such buildings in Milwaukee.
- The Courteen Seed Company at 222 West Pittsburgh Avenue is an eleven-story building with a triangular footprint designed by Louis Barnett and James Record Co. of Minneapolis and built in 1913. It is considered a late textile mill industrial loft because of its lack of ornament. (Again, that type doesn't mean it was a textile mill.)
- The Teweles Seed Company at 222 S. Third Street consists of a 12-story tower built in 1918 with a 7-story warehouse added in 1927. They were designed by the Fraser Company, with a reinforced concrete frame and brick walls.
- The Milwaukee Printing Company at 400 S. Fifth Street is a factory complex with its first section built in 1911 for the Milwaukee Printing Company. Another section was built for William H. Shinners & Company the same year. The large windows on these sections class the building as a daylight industrial loft. Milprint Incorporated added a 7-story block in 1922 and another block in 1928.
