= Boardwalk Hall Auditorium Organ =

Largest pipe organ in the world based on number of pipes

Coordinates: 39°21′13″N 74°26′19″W

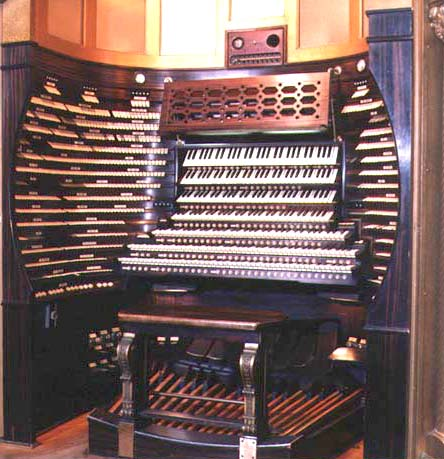
- Console with 7 manuals and 1,235 stoptabs

Keyboard instrument
- Classification: Aerophone: Pipe organ
- Developed: 1929–1932, in Atlantic City, New Jersey
- Volume: high

Playing range
- 10 octaves 7 semitones: CCCCC to g^{6} (64' to 0.5" pipes)

Related instruments
- List of pipe organs

Builders
- Midmer-Losh Organ Company

The Boardwalk Hall Auditorium Organ, also known as the Midmer-Losh and the Poseidon, is the pipe organ in the Main Auditorium of the landmark Boardwalk Hall (formerly known as Convention Hall) in Atlantic City, New Jersey. The musically versatile instrument was built by the Midmer-Losh Organ Company during 1929–1932. It is the largest organ in the world, as measured by the number of pipes – officially 33,112, but the exact number is uncertain. After decades of accumulated damage from water, building renovations, neglect, and insufficient funding, beginning in the 1990s a $100 million restoration program is gradually returning the organ to full operability.

The Main Auditorium was built as the world's largest unobstructed indoor space, a barrel vault measuring 456×310×137 feet (139×94×42 m) and enclosing 5,500,000 cubic feet (160,000 m^{3}) of air. The Auditorium Organ runs on much higher wind pressures than most organs, to be loud enough to fill the enormous space acoustically without amplification.

The organ was awarded four entries in Guinness World Records, including the largest and loudest musical instrument ever constructed. It is one of only two organs in the world to have an open 64-foot pipe rank, and the only organ to have pipes voiced on 100 inches of wind pressure (3.6 psi or 0.25 atm) and a console featuring 7 manuals and 1,235 stoptabs.

== Construction and layout ==
Construction of the organ took place from May 1929 through December 1932, shortly after the hall was built. The organ was designed by state senator Emerson Lewis Richards of Atlantic City and musician and inventor Seibert Losh and was built by the Midmer-Losh Organ Company of Merrick, New York, as its opus 5550. Most of the pipes were handmade by Midmer-Losh. Pennsylvania-based Anton Gottfried made some of the reed pipes, including the Brass Trumpet, Egyptian Horn, Euphone and Musette Mirabilis. The German firm Welte-Mignon provided the Bassoon with papier-mâché resonators and the wooden Tuba d'Amour for the Echo division.

The organ is built around the Main Auditorium of Boardwalk Hall, although no pipes are visible from the public space. The organ's pipe divisions are distributed across eight chambers behind the auditorium walls:

	Left Stage; Pedal Left, Unenclosed Choir, Swell, String I, Swell-Choir	Stage	Right Stage; Pedal Right, Percussion, Great, Solo, Great-Solo (Flues), Great-Solo (Reeds)
Left Forward; Choir				Right Forward; Brass Chorus, String II
Left Center; Gallery III (Diapasons), Gallery IV (Orchestral)	Left Upper; Fanfare, String III	The Upper chambers are located above the Center chambers	Right Upper; Echo	Right Center; Gallery I (Reeds), Gallery II (Flutes)

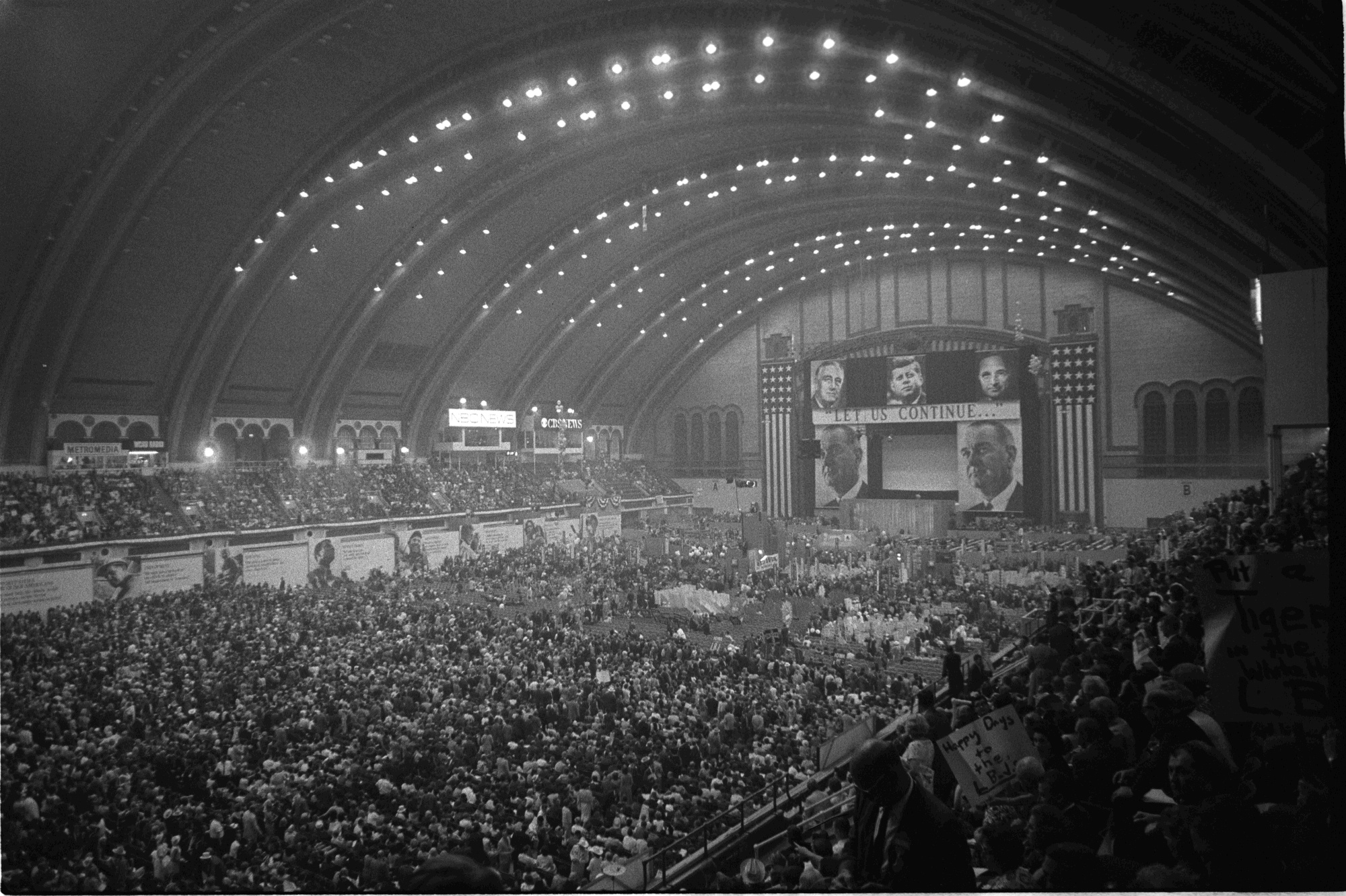
The 1964 Democratic National Convention took place in the Main Auditorium. In this photo, several of the organ's pipe chamber openings are visible to the left and right of the stage, and along the left wall at the bottom of the first giant arch from the front, at the bottom of the fourth arch, and in the ceiling of the fourth arch. The organ's main console is visible to the right of the stage, in front of the flag banner. Click for enlargements.

The current layout of the organ was Emerson Richards' third proposed design. The first design was to house 43,000 pipes in six chambers (all mentioned above without the two Forward chambers), but the quoted cost greatly exceeded the allocated $300,000, and there wasn't enough space to house all the pipes. The number of pipes was then reduced to 29,000. Later, when the Forward chambers were also used, some pipes from the original plan were reinstated, raising the number to the present official count of 33,112. The Upper chambers were placed in the ceiling above the Center chambers, as placing them any further back would result in synchronization issues due to the speed of sound, which takes nearly half a second to travel the length of the arena. Asbestos was used extensively, which would later complicate maintenance. The final contract price was $347,200, signed shortly before the Great Depression, equivalent to $6,510,000 in 2025.

== Console ==
The organ's main console is one of the largest in the world. It has 1,235 stoptabs (many unified, "borrowing" from the same pipe ranks) including 587 flue stoptabs, 265 reed stoptabs, 35 melodic percussions, 46 non-melodic percussions, 164 couplers, 18 tremulants, 120 selectors for the 6 swell pedals controlling 15 swell boxes, and a crescendo pedal.

The console is the one of the only ones in the world with 7 manuals. Uniquely, the lowest two (Choir and Great) have a range of seven octaves, and the third-lowest (Swell) has a range of six octaves, while the rest have a normal five-octave range. The bottom five keys on the Swell manual (GGG to BBB) are in place mainly for cosmetic reasons, as most ranks have no pipes for these notes; however, they would sound if couplers were activated. The manuals from top to bottom are:

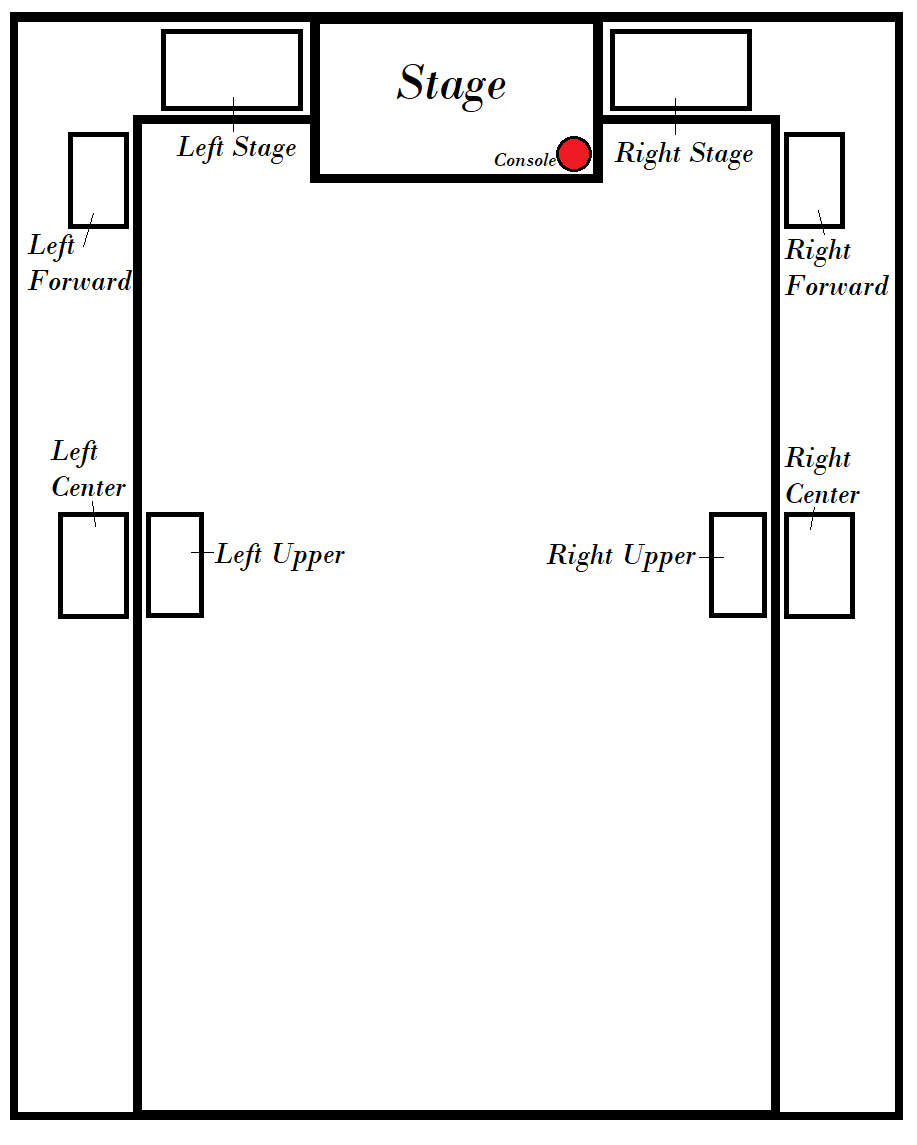
Console location among the 8 pipe chambers, approximately to scale.

VII	Bombard	5 octaves, 61 keys, CC to c^{4}
VI	Echo	5 octaves, 61 keys, CC to c^{4}
V	Fanfare	5 octaves, 61 keys, CC to c^{4}
IV	Solo	5 octaves, 61 keys, CC to c^{4}
III	Swell	6 octaves, 73 keys, GGG to g^{4}
II	Great	7 octaves, 85 keys, CCC to c^{5}
I	Choir	7 octaves, 85 keys, CCC to c^{5}

The Great and Choir manuals were designed with seven octaves so that specially extended stops (tone selections) in the pedal can be played throughout the 85-note compass of both manuals, comparable to the range of a piano. These stops can be selected by stoptabs in two divisions on the right stop jamb. The Grand Great (for the Great manual) controls stops from the Pedal Right pipe division, and the Grand Choir (for the Choir manual) controls stops from the Pedal Left pipe division. For example, the Grand Ophicleide pipes can be played from the pedalboard, and also from the Great manual by means of the Grand Great.

Likewise, some pipe divisions are independently playable on two manuals. For example, the Choir-Swell division is usually played from the Choir manual (I), but it has been "duplexed" to the Swell manual (III), stoptab for stoptab. In this way, the division's stops are also available there as the Swell-Choir, no matter which stops are selected for the Choir manual. The same is true for the Great-Solo pipes, which are usually played from the Great manual (II), but can also be selected as the Solo-Great for the Solo manual (IV).

The pedalboard and the Great and Choir manuals are equipped with "Second Touch", allowing the organist to use two different voicings by pressing the same key to different depths.

Although the four Gallery divisions (when repaired) can be played from any manual, their "home" is the Bombard manual (VII). They are the only pipe divisions playable from it, and its keyslip contains the divisional pistons for setting combinations of the Gallery stops.

An older and smaller (5-manual) console is on display in the lobby outside the auditorium, no longer connected to the instrument. Since 2019, the 7-manual main console is named in honor of Frederick R. Haas, whose family foundation has supported the Midmer-Losh and other important pipe organs in the region.

== Stops ==
Stephen D. Smith, president of the former Atlantic City Convention Hall Organ Society, comprehensively reviewed the Main Auditorium's organ stops in his 2002/2010 book and subsequent web updates, including "compound" Celeste and Mixture stops that are each built with multiple pipe ranks. His unofficial estimate of 33,116 pipes has the following distribution:

Stoplist Summary
Pipe division	Voices	Ranks	Pipes
Pedal Right	11	11	903
Pedal Left	10	16	955
Choir	29	37	2,792
Unenclosed Choir	6	9	657
Great	38	63	4,647
Great-Solo (Flues)	13	13	1,152
Great-Solo (Reeds)	12	12	972
Swell	36	55	4,456
Swell-Choir	17	17	1,542
Solo	22	33	2,085
Fanfare	21	36	2,364
Echo	22	27	1,898
Gallery I	4	10	754
Gallery II	7	9	621
Gallery III	6	9	681
Gallery IV	8	8	596
Brass Chorus	8	10	730
String I	11	20	1,436
String II	24	37	2,658
String III	9	17	1,217
Total	314	449	33,116

In addition to the 314 stops controlling the pipe ranks summarized above, the instrument also has 23 percussion voices (16 non-melodic and 7 melodic, including a motorized grand piano), for a total of 337 stops. It includes principal choruses and mixtures that are typical of German Baroque organs, and imitative orchestral stops typical of symphonic organs, along with the percussion division and extended ranks and "Second Touch" typical of theatre organs. Even before high-quality recorded music was widely available, this expansive blend of organ features would let the Midmer-Losh deliver a wide variety of music for the many performers and events that would use the multi-purpose Main Auditorium.

=== 64-foot Diaphone-Dulzian ===
Boardwalk Hall possesses a unique stop in the organ world, the 64-foot Diaphone-Dulzian in the Right Stage chamber (Pedal Right division), one of only two full-length 64-foot stops in the world. The stop is unique, because it is a reed/diaphone hybrid. (The other 64-foot stop is the Contra-Trombone reed stop in the Sydney Town Hall Grand Organ, built in 1890.)

When construction of the Auditorium Organ started, it was planned to have two 64-foot stops in the pedal, a Diaphone Profunda and a Dulzian, in the Right Stage and Left Stage chambers respectively. Later, the design was revised, and the Diaphone was omitted because it was feared it would crowd the Right Stage chamber. Consequently, the Dulzian was moved to the Right Stage chamber. However, the sound of the 64-foot Dulzian did not meet the tonal criteria, requiring Diaphone pipes to be used for the lowest 22 notes, after much experimentation. The remaining pipes in the rank are reeds. Because of the low frequencies involved, and because the diaphone is voiced to imitate a reed stop, the transition from reed to diaphone cannot be detected. (For several decades, diaphone technology was also used for foghorns.)

The Diaphone-Dulzian's low-C pipe is 59 feet (18 m) in length, has an upper width and a base mechanism that are each nearly 3 feet (1 m), and weighs 3,350 pounds (1,520 kg). It produces a frequency of 8 Hz, a tone that is more felt than heard, five octaves below middle C. The sound of the vibrating pallet is described as "a helicopter hovering over the building". The wooden pipe is upright for about 40 feet (12 m), the remainder is mitered (angled) towards the Right Stage chamber grille, like an upside-down L. All pipes taller than 32 feet (10 m) were designed in this manner. The two lowest pipes (CCCCC and CCCCC#) are fed by a single, dedicated 8-inch diameter wind line, operating on 35 inches of pressure. A second identical wind line feeds the remaining pipes.

The Diaphone-Dulzian is sufficiently extended so that 64-, 32-, 16-, 8- and 4-foot unison stops, and 42 2/3-foot, 21 1/3-foot and 10 2/3-foot mutation stops, may be drawn from the same rank of pipes. Also, when the 64-foot and 42 2/3-foot are combined, the resultant tone simulates a 128-foot stop, equivalent to 4 Hz on low C.

Use of the Diaphone-Dulzian is rare, being used primarily in registrations of moderate volume. In very big combinations it is lost, and in smaller ones it is too loud. Nonetheless, when the stop was first tested in 1930, it caused tiles to fall from the auditorium ceiling and structural elements of the building to rattle.

=== 32-foot stops ===
To provide the power needed in the pedal, the organ has ten 32-foot stops:

Stop	Division
Tibia Clausa 32'	Pedal Right
Bombardon 32'	Pedal Right
Diaphone 32'	Pedal Left
Diapason 32'	Pedal Left
Bombard 32'	Pedal Left
Fagotto 32'	Pedal Left
Sub Principal 32'	Great
Trombone 32'	Fanfare
Violone 32'	Echo
Diaphone-Dulzian 32' (extension of 64')	Pedal Right

=== Grand Ophicleide ===
The Grand Ophicleide in the organ's Pedal Right division, behind the Right Stage chamber grille, speaking on 100" wind pressure, was recognized by Guinness World Records as the loudest organ stop in the world. It is described as having "a pure trumpet note of ear-splitting volume, more than six times the volume of the loudest locomotive whistle." The Grand Ophicleide produces up to 130 decibels at a distance of 1 meter, and is designed to be heard throughout the auditorium over any other stops that might be playing. The pipes were built by Roscoe Evans, who served as the organ's first curator.

Because of the high pressure on which the pipes stand, they must be tightly secured to the pipe chest, with individual parts secured to each other. If any wind leaks, a whistle may be heard, almost as loud as the pipes themselves. The highest 12 notes are produced by special flue pipes having a similar voice and timbre. All of the reed pipes use weighted tongues. The tuning wires are held firmly in place to maintain the correct tuning. The 8' rank is made from lead alloy of exceptional thickness (to prevent the pipes from cracking under the extreme sonic vibrations), while the 16' octave is made of wood.

The Grand Ophicleide rank is extended one octave above the 16' unison rank, allowing an 8' register to be drawn from the rank. It is playable from the 85-key Great manual and from the 32-key pedalboard.

=== Grand Cornet XI ===
The largest single stop in the organ by number of pipes, the Grand Cornet contains 11 ranks totaling 803 pipes, nearly 2.5% of the entire organ, and larger than the full instruments of many small churches. This compound stop is spread across two pipe chests, and speaks on 20" wind pressure. The ranks are 10 2/3', 8', 5 1/3', 4', 3 1/5', 2 2/3', 2 2/7', 2', 1 3/5', 1 1/3', and 1', with the last three also available as a Scharf Mixture stop. The 8', 3 1/5', and 2' ranks use flared and tapered pipes, and the 2 2/3' uses harmonic pipes. The 4' pipes are double languid. The Grand Cornet was fully restored and brought back on line in 2023, returning "a signature clang" to the tone quality of the instrument.

== Records and distinctions ==
The organ has been recognized by Guinness World Records as the largest musical instrument, the loudest musical instrument, and the largest pipe organ ever constructed, although debate exists about the selection criteria. (Philadelphia's twice-expanded Wanamaker Organ has fewer pipes but more pipe ranks, and is fully operational.) Guinness also recognized the Grand Ophicleide in the Pedal Right division to be the loudest organ stop in the world (until it was surpassed by the Vox Maris, a 1-rank outdoor instrument that relies on compressed air, built for South Korea's Expo 2012).

The Boardwalk Hall Auditorium Organ and the smaller Ballroom Organ (a 55-rank theatre organ, Kimball opus 7073) were both recognized by the multi-national Organ Historical Society as instruments "of historical value and worthy of preservation" as part of its Historic Organ Citations program. The Citations, numbers 313 and 314, were presented to the New Jersey Sports and Exposition Authority on October 26, 2004.

Officially, the Auditorium Organ has 33,112 pipes, but the exact number is uncertain. It is very hard to determine exactly how many pipes the organ has, due to undocumented revisions made during its construction, followed by extensive damage that is still being repaired, further confounded by erroneous reports that have circulated over the years.

The Auditorium Organ is the only one in the world to have stops standing on 100 inches of wind pressure. It is also the only organ to have two 32-foot pedal stops on 50 inches wind pressure. There are two more organs in the world with stops on 50 inches, but these are 8-foot solo trumpet or tuba stops. For perspective, 100 inches wind pressure, equivalent to 3.6 psi or 0.25 atm, is about 30 times more than a normal organ stop; even high-pressure stops usually stand on only 10 to 12 inches. The Auditorium Organ has four stops on 100 inches (also known as the "Big Reeds") and ten stops on 50 inches wind pressure:

Stop	Division	Wind pressure
Grand Ophicleide 16'	Pedal Right	100"
Tuba Imperial 8'	Solo	100"
Trumpet Mirabilis 16'	Gallery I	100"
Tuba Maxima 8'	Gallery I	100"
Diaphone 32'	Pedal Left	50"
Tuba Magna 16'	Solo	50"
Bugle 8'	Solo	50"
Bombard 32'	Pedal Left	50"
Major Posaune 16'	Pedal Left	50"
Diaphone Phonon 16'	Pedal Right	50"
Posaune 16'	Fanfare	50"
Harmonic Tuba 8'	Fanfare	50"
Ophicleide 8'	Fanfare	50"
Major Clarion 4'	Fanfare	50"

Apart from the aforementioned stops on record-high wind pressure, almost every division stands on at least 15 inches wind pressure, except for the Choir on 10 inches and the Baroque-style Unenclosed Choir on a more-traditional 3 3/4 inches. Also, some individual stops stand on low wind pressure; for example, the Diapason X of the Great division stands on only 4 inches.

The organ's wind supply is the most-powerful ever used in a pipe organ. The DC motors for the original eight blowers had a total of 394 horsepower (294 kW), pumping 36,400 cubic feet (1,030 m^{3}) of wind per minute. Around 1990, these were replaced by seven blowers with AC motors totaling 630 horsepower (470 kW).

== Damage and restoration ==
=== 1944 water damage and long neglect ===
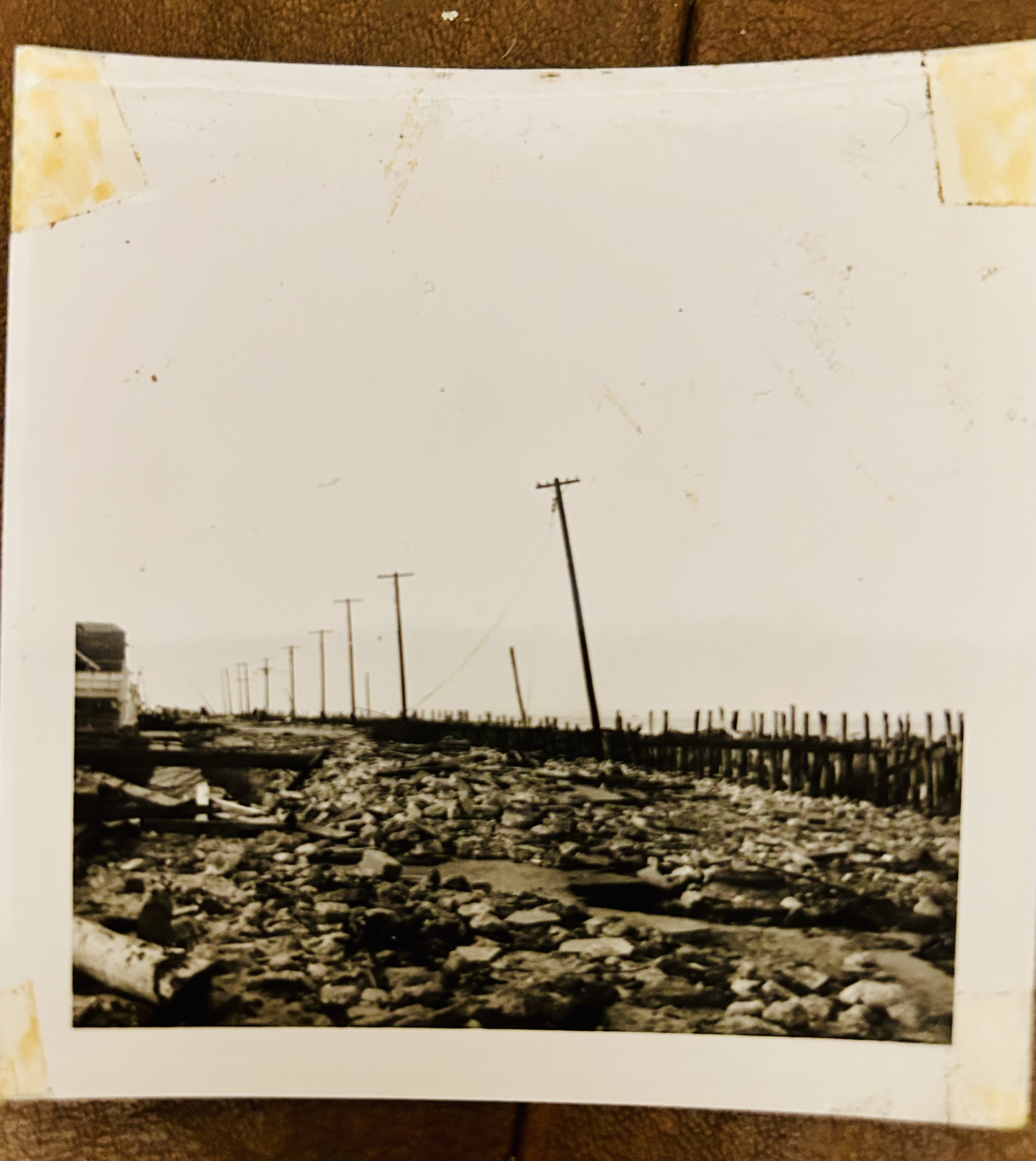
Atlantic City Boardwalk in ruins after the 1944 Great Atlantic Hurricane

The Auditorium Organ has not been fully functional since the 1944 Great Atlantic Hurricane, when the subterranean floors of the oceanfront Boardwalk Hall were flooded for days with seawater from storm surge. This significantly damaged the organ blowers and completely destroyed the electro-pneumatic combination action for the organ stops. Additional water damage resulted earlier from plumbing failures and later from leaking roof areas and air-conditioning equipment. The organ's first 50 years also unluckily included the Great Depression in the 1930s, World War II in the 1940s, and then Atlantic City's gradual pre-casino decline through the 1970s. For decades, tight government funding and staffing were insufficient to keep pace with the maintenance and repair needs of the world's largest pipe organ, despite the best efforts of its curators.

=== 1998 partial restoration ===
In September 1998, the New Jersey Sports and Exposition Authority provided a $1.17 million grant, which restored to playable condition the Right Stage chamber of the Main Auditorium Organ and the entire Ballroom Organ. Afterwards, a recording session took place, which captured the main organ's record-holders (the 64' Diaphone-Dulzian, and the 100" Tuba Imperial and Grand Ophicleide) shortly before the hall closed for a multi-year renovation.

=== 1999–2001 construction damage ===
Both organs experienced severe damage during the 1999–2001 renovation of Boardwalk Hall, due to inadequate planning and oversight and the carelessness of workers. The organ curator position was furloughed, and Dennis McGurk's personal efforts to protect the instruments were no match for an army of construction contractors throughout the building. Pipes were removed, bent, and stepped on. (Most organ pipes are made from soft alloys based on lead, so it is very easy to dent or crush them.) The 32-foot Trombone stop was effectively entombed in the building's walls when an opening in the Left Upper chamber, which allowed the rank to speak through the grille in the ceiling, was sealed off. As parts of the building were demolished for reconstruction, windlines to various pipe chambers were cut, with no effort to identify or protect the lines, nor any plans to re-route or repair them. The elaborate electrical relay for the Left Stage chamber was cut out with no provision for its restoration, and various switching and control cables were severed. Cement dust disrupted thousands of minimally protected switching contacts, magnets, and organ pipes. The 5-manual console connection was cut. All this left the Auditorium Organ heavily damaged and the Right Stage chamber, which was 98% operational in 1998, completely disabled. The relay of the Ballroom Organ was also removed in a careless way and its control cables severed, rendering that organ unplayable as well.

=== Ongoing restoration ===
In 2013, the Main Auditorium Organ once again began to be heard, with 15–20% of it restored as funding was secured. The organ was played in September 2013 during the Miss America pageant, its first public performance in 40 years. Since 2014, free half-hour noon concerts are offered Monday through Friday from May through September, excluding holidays and special events. Since 2015, in-depth "behind the scenes" tours are available on Wednesdays at 10 a.m. for most of the year. On September 1, 2015, Nathan Bryson became the fifth curator of the Boardwalk Hall organs, to lead a dedicated crew of maintenance professionals and volunteers. Both organs are gradually returning to the regular musical life of the building as their mechanical condition permits.

The current restoration program, led by the Historic Organ Restoration Committee (HORC, a nonprofit 501(c) organization), is a $16 million project funded entirely by donations from charitable foundations and the general public. The restoration effort focuses on re-leathering the full Auditorium Organ, as well as repairing damage to the original pipework and mechanical/electrical systems sustained from construction and water over the years.

HORC reports that as of 2024, 95% of the Ballroom Kimball Organ and 67% of the Main Auditorium Midmer-Losh Organ are operational again, the latter including most of the pipe ranks in the Right Stage, Left Stage and Left Forward chambers. Restoration work is ongoing and proceeding, as the organs' 100th anniversary approaches in 2029–2032.
