= Seibert Losh =

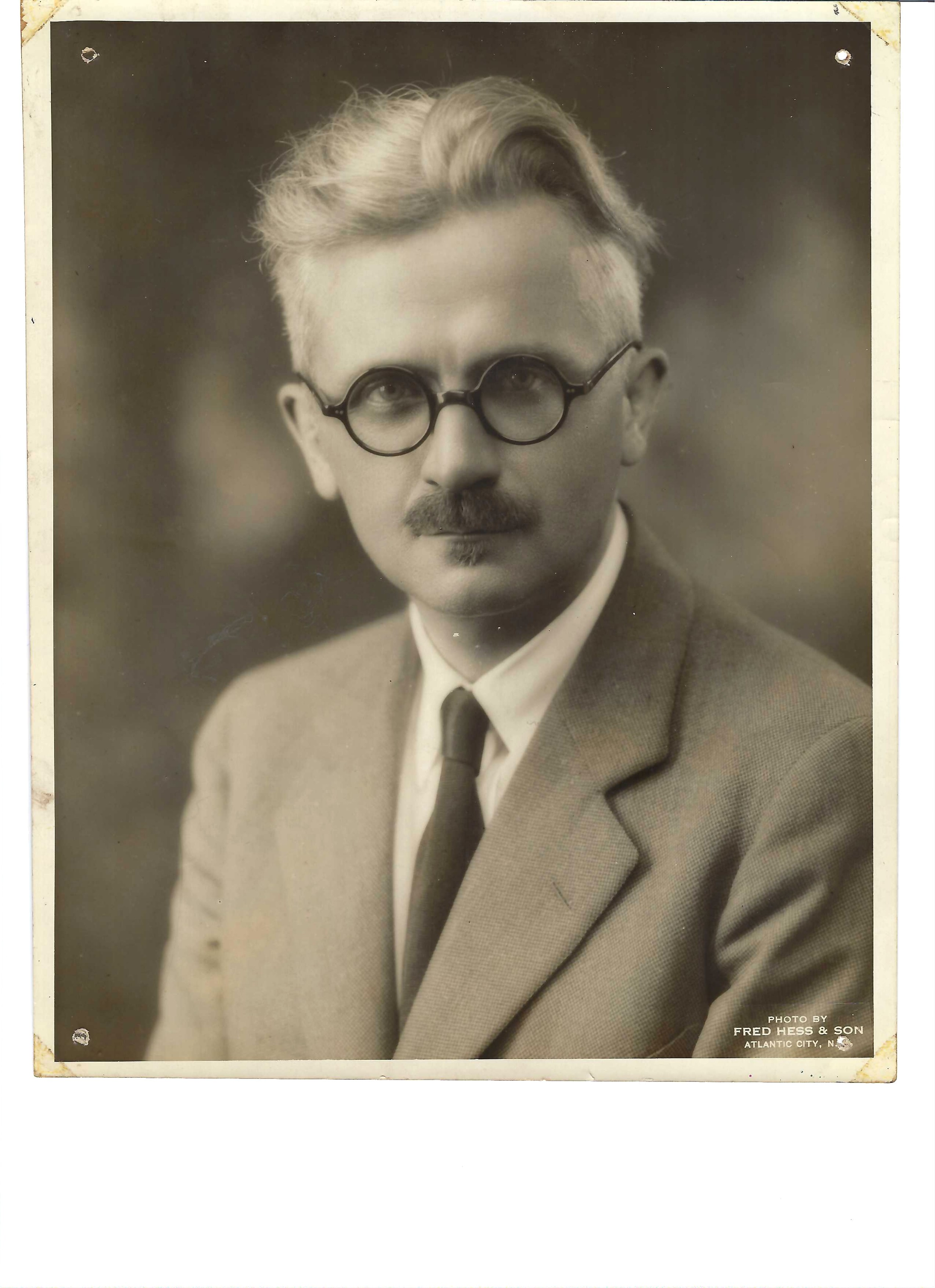
Charles Seibert Losh in 1931

Charles Seibert Losh (1880–1934) was an American musician, conductor, and organ builder. He was president of the Midmer-Losh Organ Company and oversaw the initial installation of the Boardwalk Hall Auditorium Organ, which is often described as the largest musical instrument in the world. Losh designed this organ with Republican New Jersey State Senator Emerson Richards, although the relationship ended in lawsuits and acrimony.

Losh was associated with a number of technical innovations in organ construction. He often consulted with fellow organ builder George Audsley. In 1921 he patented a new organ-pipe design. In 1925 he installed a seven-octave manual in the Central Christian Church in Miami, Florida, an innovation which he described as "here to stay." He installed a custom Midmer-Losh organ in 1926 in the recording studio of Thomas Edison and wrote about his collaborations with Edison in trade publications. The Edison organ was sold to the Derry Church in 1933. Composer Charles Ives also corresponded with Losh about purchasing an organ, but the sale was never completed.

Before running his own company, Losh installed the organ at the West Point Cadet Chapel in 1911, which has also been considered one of the largest in the world, while working for the Moller Organ Company. He was known for pioneering the use of the pipe organ as accompaniment for film in New York City. Before leaving the Moller organization in 1918, as Eastern sales manager, Losh persuaded the Fox and Loews corporations to sign organ purchase contracts for their chains.

He was the brother of singer and composer Samuel S. Losh. His granddaughter is the media scholar Elizabeth Losh.
