= Vox Maris (musical instrument) =

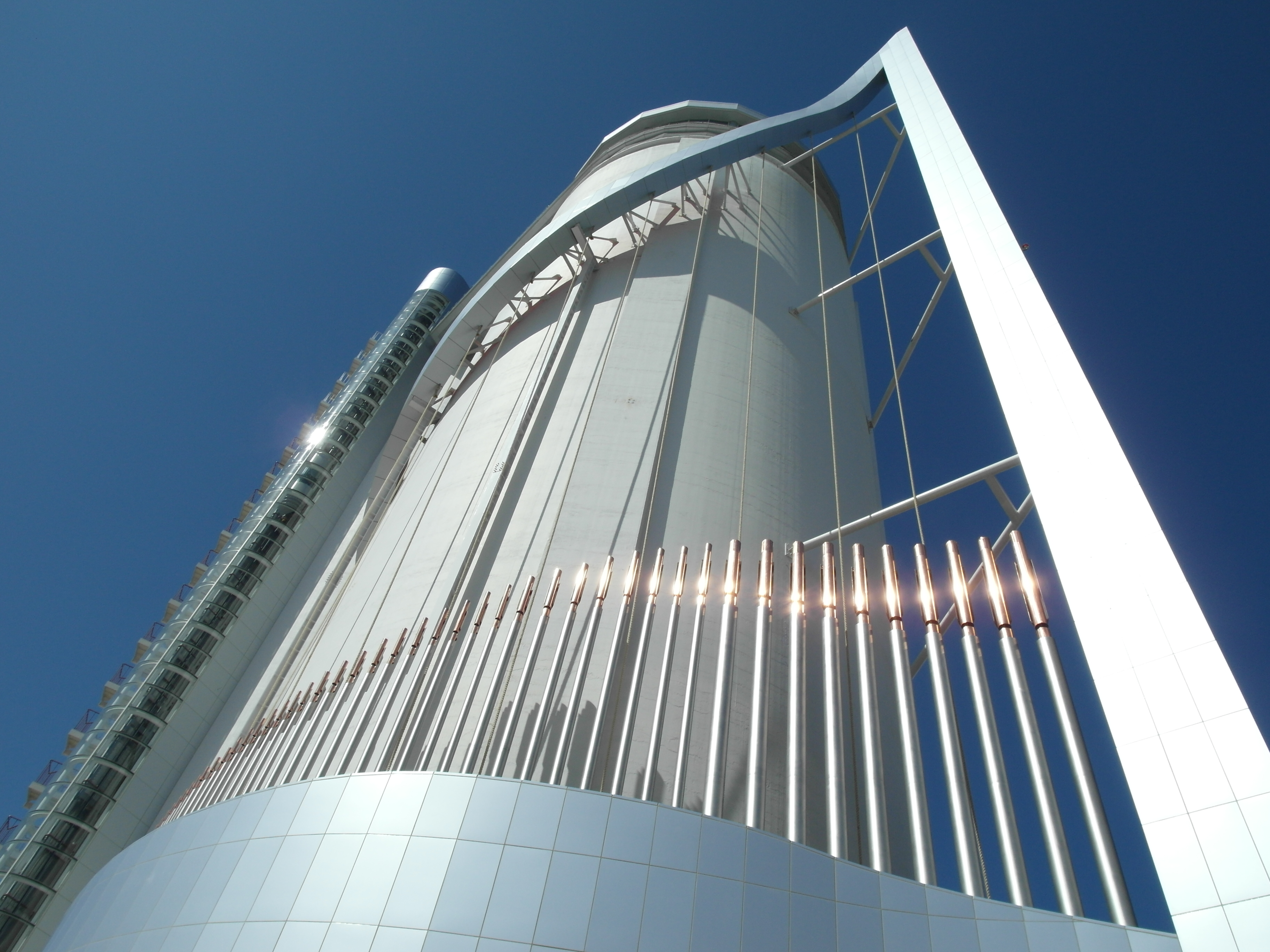
- Classification: Pipe organ: Wind; Aerophone

Playing range
- 32' (A - e´´ ´´ ´´)

Builders
- Hey Orgelbau

More articles or information
- Expo 2012

The Vox Maris (Latin: "Voice of the Sea") is an instrument that was built for the Yeosu Expo 2012 in Korea by the German organ building company Hey Orgelbau (Hey Orgelbau) and was recognized as the acoustic signet of the exposition. It combines elements of the pipe organ and the steam whistle. The Vox Maris entwines itself around the twin sky towers at a height of 72 metres (236 ft). It is considered an aerophone, since its dynamic high pressure organ pipes are powered by air. It can be played from a wireless tablet-pc.

The construction process was documented by a film team of German Bavarian Television.

On 21 October 2011, Guinness World Records confirmed the Vox Maris as the loudest pipe organ in the world, producing a reading of 138.4 dbA.

In 2015, the RID (Rekord-Institut für Deutschland) corroborated the Vox Maris as the loudest pipe organ.

== Specifications ==
Sources:

- organ rank called "Vox Maris"
  - 80 dynamic pipes
  - range A - e´´ ´´ ´´
  - length of the longest pipe: 10.00 m
  - length of the smallest pipe: 1.70 m
  - weight of the pipe A: more than 850 kg
  - material: stainless steel, copper and brass
- sculpture "Sound Wave":
  - height: 72 m
  - length: 33 m (wrapped around in S-shape)
- wind supply:
  - compressed air system
  - performance: (PS, m^{3}/min) 110 kW, 20,000 L/min
  - 5000 L air tank
  - wind pressure in mmWS: 10,000–100,000 mmWS
- console (pipe organ):
  - mobile
  - 1 manual, 80 keys
  - pedal, 30 keys
  - register knobs
  - multiple coupler functions
  - touchscreen
  - control via Android App
- tracture(pipe organ):
  - key action: electric
  - stop action: electric
- weight of the organ: c. 23,000 kg

== Bibliography ==
- Guinness World Records 2013, page 197
- The Magazine of the International Society of Organbuilders, ISO Journal, Number 43, pages 46–54
