= Midmer–Losh Organ Company =

The Midmer–Losh Organ Company is a defunct pipe organ building business located in Merrick, New York.

Reuben Midmer founded his own organ-building company in Brooklyn, New York in 1860. His son, Reed, began working at the shop at the age of 14 and eventually took charge of the shop. Around 1875, the company's name was changed to "Reuben Midmer & Son." After Reuben's death, Reed purchased the business from his father's estate; and in 1906, he moved the shop to Merrick.

Brothers Seibert Losh and George Losh acquired the Midmer & Son firm in 1920 and changed the name of the firm to "Midmer-Losh Organ Company" in 1924. Seibert was the former New York representative for the MP Moller organ company. In May 1932, Seibert was terminated by the company, and the new president became Otto Strack.

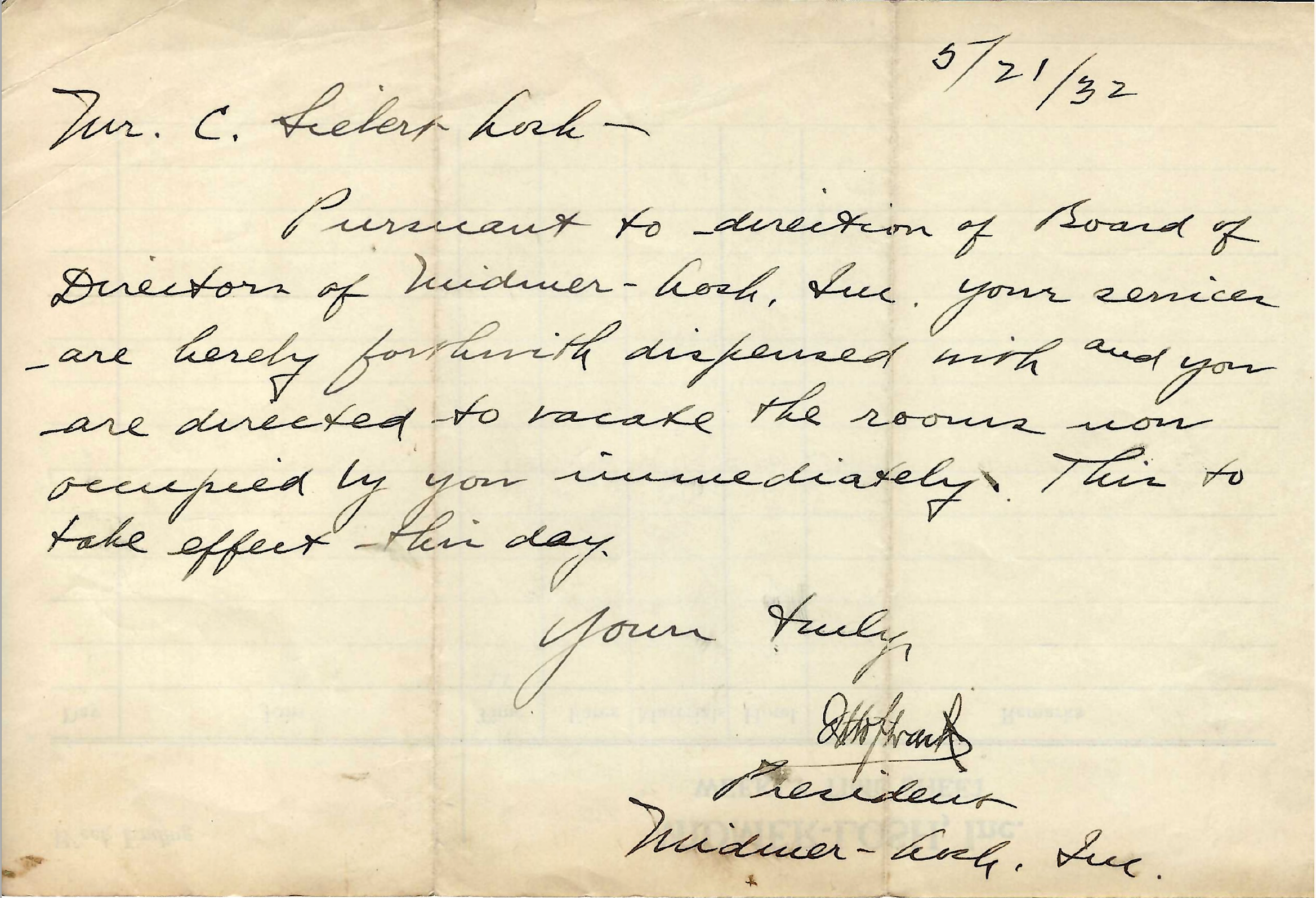
Termination notice of Seibert Losh from Otto Strack

Among the many instruments built, the company made 42 theatre organs during the age of silent films. It also built what is currently the world's largest pipe organ: the Boardwalk Hall Auditorium Organ in the Boardwalk Hall, Atlantic City, New Jersey; inaugurated in 1932, it has over 33,000 pipes controlled from a seven-manual console. However, due to flooding, neglect and building renovations, some parts of the organ are currently inoperable and undergoing renovation.

There is also a fully operational and reconditioned Midmer-Losh organ at the Church of the Assumption, Ansonia, CT. Reconditioning work was completed in 1999 by Foley-Baker Inc. It has roughly 30 ranks and slightly over 2,000 pipes. It was built on or about the same time as the organ in Atlantic City.
