= 1944 Great Atlantic hurricane =

Category 5-equivalent Atlantic hurricane in 1944

Hurricane Seven 1944 Great Atlantic hurricane
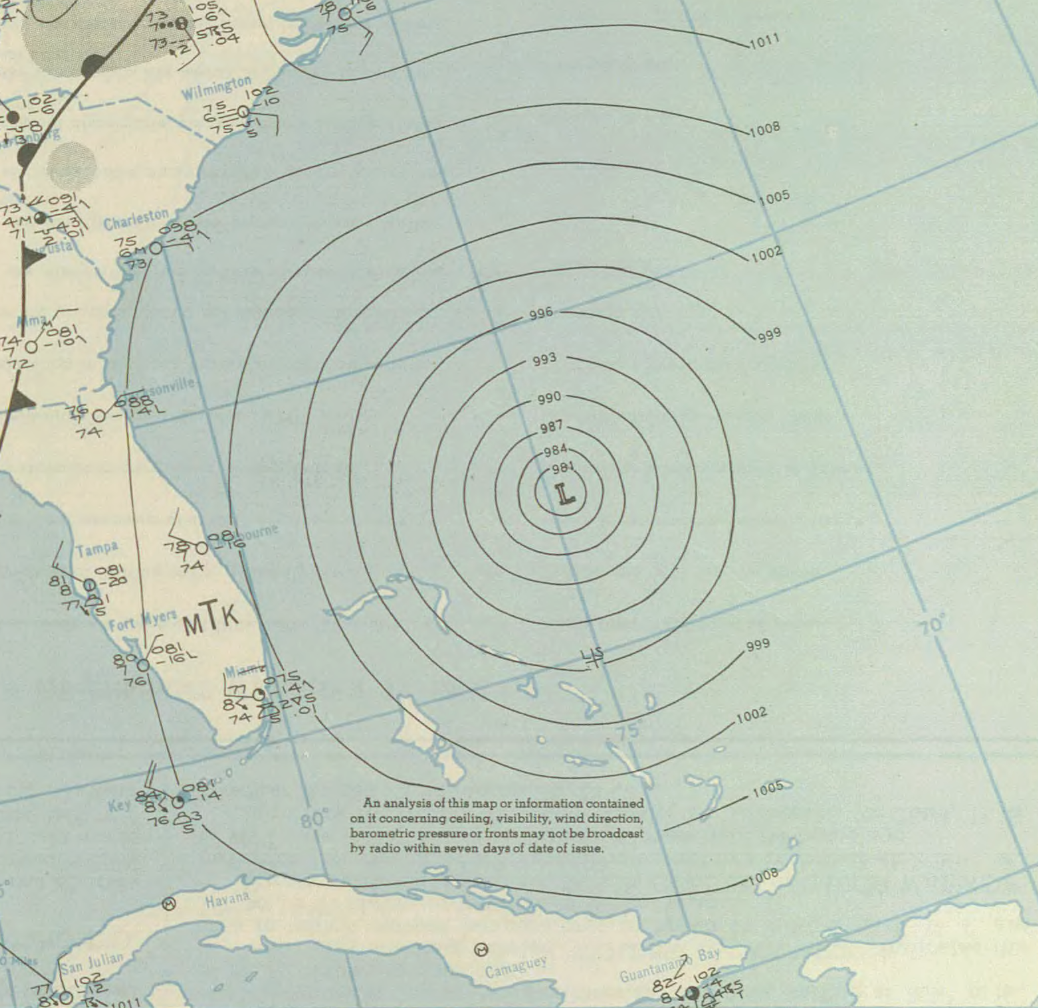
- Surface weather analysis of the storm at peak intensity on September 13

Meteorological history
- Formed: September 9, 1944
- Extratropical: September 15, 1944
- Dissipated: September 16, 1944

Category 5 major hurricane
- 1-minute sustained (SSHWS/NWS)
- Highest winds: 160 mph (260 km/h)
- Lowest pressure: ≤918 mbar (hPa); ≤27.11 inHg

Overall effects
- Fatalities: 300–400, primarily at sea
- Damage: $100 million (1944 USD)
- Areas affected: United States East Coast (especially New England), Atlantic Canada
- IBTrACS
- Part of the 1944 Atlantic hurricane season

The 1944 Great Atlantic hurricane was a destructive and powerful tropical cyclone that swept across a large portion of the United States East Coast in September 1944. New England was most affected, though so were the Outer Banks, Mid-Atlantic states, and the Canadian Maritimes. The storm's ferocity and path drew comparisons to the 1938 Long Island Express, one of the worst storms in New England history.

Its precursor was first identified well east of the Lesser Antilles on September 4, but the disturbance only became well organized enough to be considered a tropical cyclone on September 9 northeast of the Virgin Islands. Tracking west-northwest, the storm gradually intensified, curved northward, and reached peak intensity as a Category 5 hurricane on September 13 north of the Bahamas. A day later, the storm passed the Outer Banks and later made landfall on Long Island and Rhode Island as a weaker hurricane on September 15. The storm eventually became an extratropical cyclone, moving northeast, and merged with another extratropical system off Greenland on September 16.

== Meteorological history ==
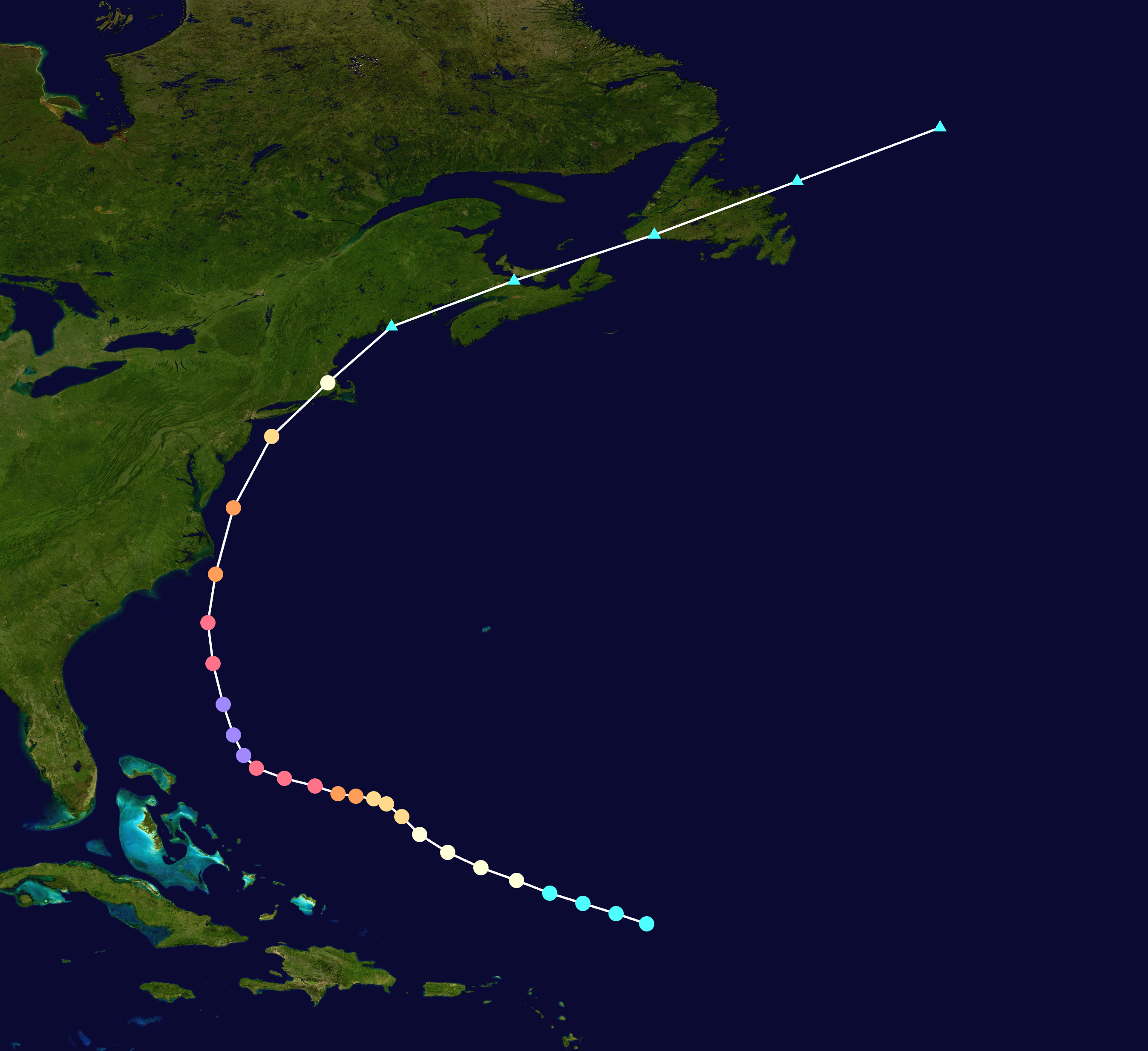
Map plotting the storm's track and intensity, according to the Saffir–Simpson scale Map key Saffir–Simpson scale Tropical depression (≤38 mph, ≤62 km/h) Tropical storm (39–73 mph, 63–118 km/h) Category 1 (74–95 mph, 119–153 km/h) Category 2 (96–110 mph, 154–177 km/h) Category 3 (111–129 mph, 178–208 km/h) Category 4 (130–156 mph, 209–251 km/h) Category 5 (≥157 mph, ≥252 km/h) Unknown Storm type Tropical cyclone Subtropical cyclone Extratropical cyclone, remnant low, tropical disturbance, or monsoon depression

The origins of the 1944 hurricane can be traced back to a tropical wave first identified well east of the Lesser Antilles on September 4. Over the next few days, the disturbance slowly traversed west-northwestward without producing any significant weather that would hint at tropical cyclogenesis. On September 7, an area of low pressure, albeit disorganized, formed in association with the tropical wave east of Barbados. The following day, the barometric depression became more well-defined, prompting the Weather Bureau in San Juan, Puerto Rico to issue advisories on the tropical disturbance. As a result of the sparseness of available surface observations east of the Lesser Antilles, a reconnaissance flight was dispatched to investigate the storm late on September 9; the flight reported that the disturbance had strengthened into a newly formed but fully-fledged hurricane. Due to the seemingly rapid development of the storm, the Atlantic hurricane reanalysis project concluded that the storm likely began earlier and as a weaker system; thus, HURDAT—the official track database for hurricanes in the North Atlantic dating back to 1851—lists the tropical cyclone as having begun a tropical storm with winds of 50 mph (80 km/h) at 06:00 UTC on September 9.

After formation, the tropical cyclone gradually intensified as it slowly moved west-northwestward, reaching the threshold for hurricane intensity at 06:00 UTC on September 10 while north of the Virgin Islands. Strengthening continued thereafter, and by September 12, the storm reached an intensity equivalent to a Category 3 hurricane on the modern-day Saffir–Simpson hurricane wind scale. Later that day, the cyclone strengthened further into a Category 4-equivalent and was given the moniker of "Great Atlantic hurricane" by the Weather Bureau in Miami, Florida. Concurrently, the tropical cyclone began to curve and accelerate towards the north. At 06:00 UTC on September 13, the hurricane reached its peak intensity with maximum sustained winds of 160 mph (260 km/h),, and five hours later, a ship in the eye documented a minimum barometric pressure of 919 mbar (hPa; 27.14 inHg) alongside 15-knot (17 mph; 28 km/h) winds, suggesting a central pressure of 918 mbar (918 hPa; 27.1 inHg). The storm's pressure may have been lower during its lifespan, though the 909 mbar (909 hPa; 26.8 inHg) pressure suggested by meteorologist Ivan Ray Tannehill was considered too low.

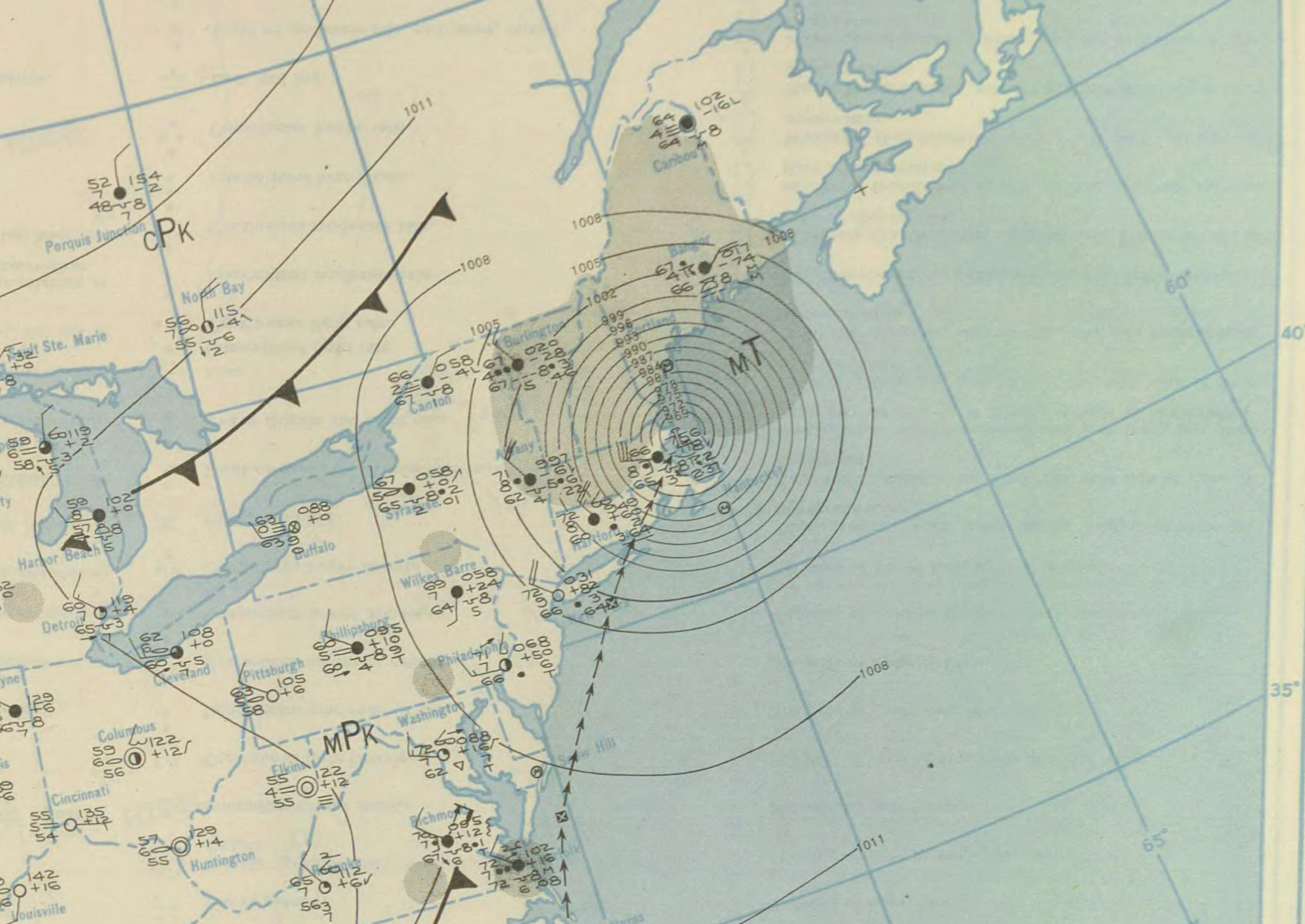
Surface weather map of the hurricane off the coast of Massachusetts on September 15

The hurricane began to gradually weaken after reaching peak intensity on September 13. In the morning hours of September 14, the storm passed just east of Cape Hatteras and eastern Virginia as a small but powerful hurricane with winds of 125 mph (201 km/h). Afterwards, the cyclone curved slightly further towards the northeast and continued to accelerate; at 02:00 UTC on September 15, the hurricane made landfall near Southampton in eastern Long Island with winds of 105 mph (169 km/h). The storm then crossed the island and Long Island Sound before making a second landfall two hours later near Point Judith, Rhode Island as a slightly weaker storm with winds of 100 mph (160 km/h). After crossing Rhode Island and Massachusetts, the tropical system transitioned into an extratropical cyclone off the coast of Maine on September 15; these extratropical remnants continued to track towards the northeast and across the Canadian Maritimes before they were last noted merging with another extratropical cyclone off of Greenland at 12:00 UTC on September 16.

== Preparations ==
Upon being designated a tropical cyclone, the Weather Bureau began advising extreme caution to shipping within the expected path of the hurricane. Precaution was also urged in the eastern Bahamas. The first hurricane warning issued by the Weather Bureau in association with the storm was for the northern Bahamas on September 12. In Miami, Florida, the American Red Cross began preparing its resources for a potential regional calamity; however, the Weather Bureau did not necessarily anticipate the storm striking Miami. Royal Air Force aircraft stationed in Nassau were flown to Miami in order to avoid the storm. Although tropical cyclone naming was not in practice at the time, the Weather Bureau in Miami, Florida, began naming the system the "Great Atlantic hurricane" in their public advisories on September 12 to better convey the life-threatening risks associated with the powerful hurricane. The following day, storm warnings were issued for areas from the United States East Coast from Savannah, Georgia to Cape Hatteras. Small craft in offshore areas further south were advised to remain in port. As Morehead City, North Carolina was forecast to be submerged under several feet of water, the city's entire population was evacuated; other resort locales along the coast of North Carolina were also evacuated. Similarly, the 3000–4000 personnel constituting Marine Corps Air Station Cherry Point were evacuated inland; U.S. Army and Navy aircraft were also sent inland.

As the hurricane was passing near the Outer Banks, hurricane warnings were extended as far north as Portland, Maine, and storm warnings were issued as far north as Eastport, Maine. Precautions across New England and Mid-Atlantic states began in earnest once the storm began tracking northwards. Sixty buses were readied in Ocean City, Maryland to evacuate the seaside resort's permanent and tourist residents. The 3,000 residents of Fire Island, one of the barrier islands off of Long Island, were ordered to evacuate the islet. Nearby, the Brooklyn Red Cross Chapter began readying for possible relief work, stocking five mobile canteens with emergency rations. The United States First Naval District were directed to have personnel and rescue craft on standby to respond to emergencies. The Massachusetts State Police began relaying Weather Bureau bulletins to local public services via telecommunications. Personnel on duty were called back to barracks for later deployment in relief operations. The Massachusetts National Guard were ordered to standby and prepare for potential assistance of regional emergency services. Other Massachusetts state agencies were also allocating resources to aid in relief operations.

== Impact ==
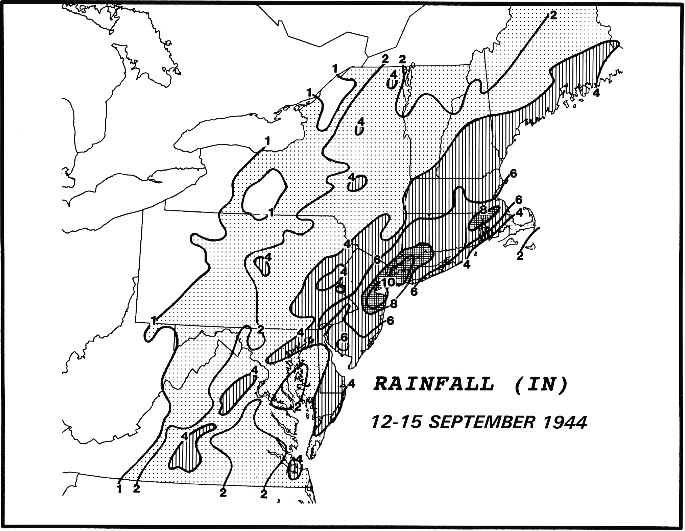
Rainfall totals from the hurricane over the northeastern U.S.

=== North Carolina ===
The hurricane passed east of North Carolina on the morning of September 14; while stronger winds prevailed offshore, parts of the North Carolina coast experienced Category 2 hurricane conditions according to the Atlantic hurricane reanalysis project. The peak sustained winds in the state were estimated by the project to have reached approximately 105 mph (165 km/h), with the high winds punctuated by higher gusts. The highest reported wind speeds in the state occurred at Hatteras, where 5-minute sustained winds peaked at an estimated 85 mph (135 km/h). With the eye remaining mostly offshore, the resulting impacts of the hurricane in the state were limited to areas east of the 77th meridian west. The hurricane inflicted about $1 million in crop damage and $450,000 in property damage in North Carolina, with wind-related impacts accounting for most of the damage toll. More than 600 buildings were damaged in the central and northern coastal areas of the state, of which 108 were destroyed. The Weather Bureau enumerated 3,279 damaged buildings and 389 destroyed buildings across the state. Telecommunications were also disrupted throughout the North Carolina coast between Morehead City and the state border with Virginia. One person was killed and 28 were injured statewide.

The Outer Banks were particularly hard-hit by the passing storm; while the strong southeasterly winds accompanying the hurricane's approach pushed water from Pamlico Sound westward, opposing winds that followed the storm's passage caused the backed up water to surge back east, flooding villages in the Outer Banks. Storm surge along unprotected coastline destroyed hundreds of boats, damaged boardwalks, and deposited debris along the Carolina beaches. At Hatteras, the tide level crested at 7 ft (2.1 m) above the mean low tide. The raised seas inundated coastal farmland and homes with 2–4 ft (0.61–1.22 m) of water. At Avon, this surge of water accumulated between sand barriers surrounding the community, separating homes from their foundations and sending them adrift; 96 homes in Avon either sustained severe damage or were washed away. Rodanthe was also hard-hit, with the storm destroying the community's cistern water systems and leaving only two of its homes standing. At Roanoke Island, the storm tides reached 1 ft (0.30 m) higher than any previous storm on record there. Manteo was inundated under 6 ft (1.8 m) of water while Wanchese at the southern end of the island experienced tides reaching 10 ft (3.0 m). The island was also subjected to wind gusts as strong as 120 mph (195 km/h), contributing to widespread damage to homes and transportation infrastructure. Many summer cottages along the beach at Nags Head were unroofed and all telecommunications and power lines along a 15 mi (24 km) stretch of the beach were blown down. One person was killed at Nags Head after being electrocuted by a fallen power line. Surge and winds washed out 3,000 ft (910 m) of pavement along the causeway connecting Roanoke Island and the North Carolina mainland; a second bridge crossing the same stretch of water was also heavily damaged. A towed barge was set adrift during the storm and collided with another highway bridge crossing an inland waterway at Coinjock, severely damaging the bridge. Gusts at Cape Hatteras reached approximately 110 mph (180 km/h), with the accompanying sustained winds reaching record-high velocities at Hatteras.

Winds of around 75 mph (120 km/h) brought down power and telephone lines in the Elizabeth City area, leaving the city without power for 10 hours. The strong winds razed homes in the region and along nearby beaches, though no deaths or injuries resulted from the hurricane's forces there. The winds also broke aircraft away from their moorings at a Consolidated Vultee airbase. The Elizabeth City area incurred around $25,000 in damage while nearby Edenton incurred $10,000 in damage. Substantial crop damage occurred around the Albermarle area. Homes were unroofed as far south as Morehead City; trees and business signage in the city were also blown down by the winds. Power outages impacted New Bern, North Carolina.

=== Virginia ===
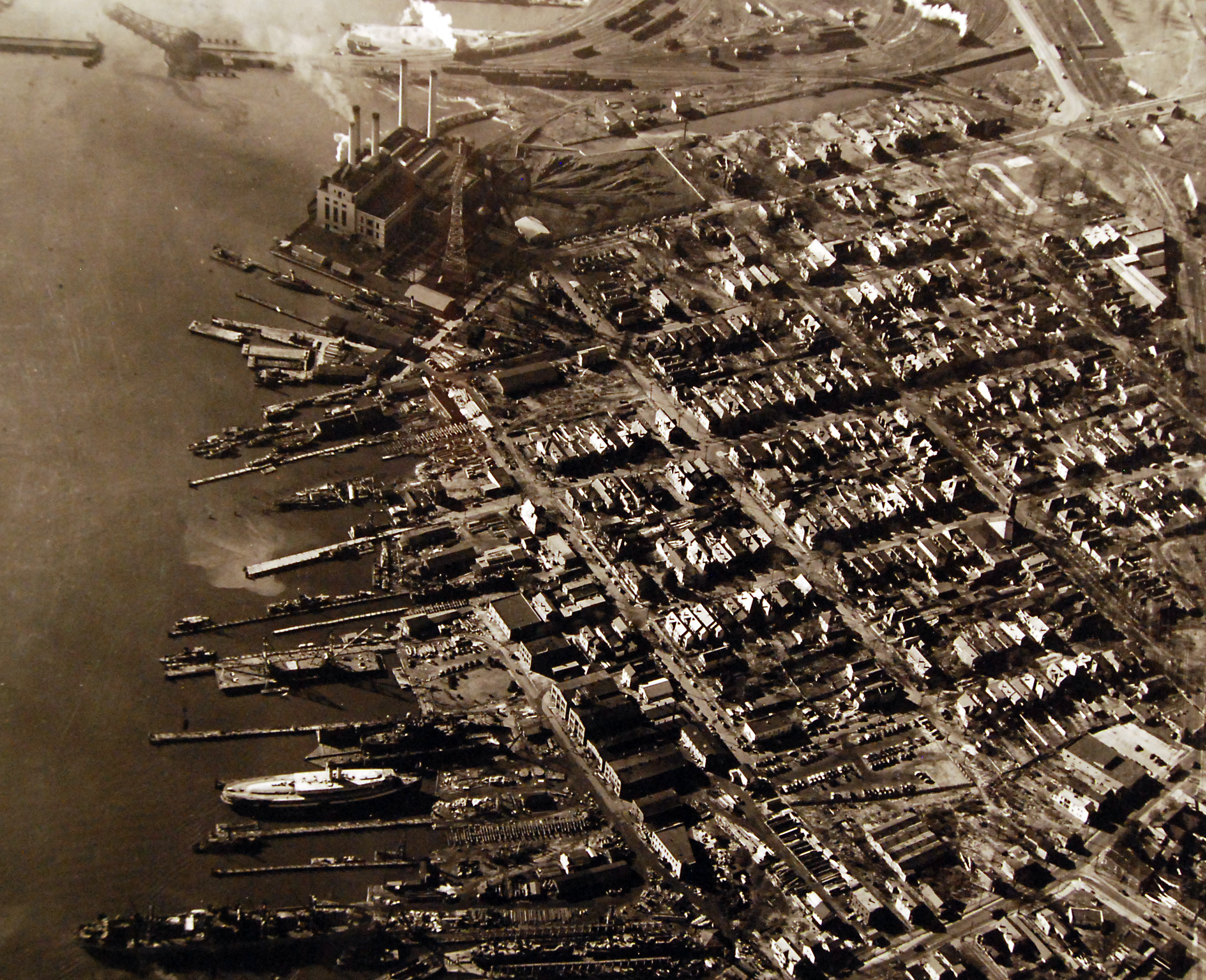
Aerial view of the Norfolk Shipbuilding and Drydock Company in Norfolk, Virginia in January 1944. Norfolk and the Hampton Roads area were among the hardest-hit areas in Virginia.

The passing hurricane brought Category 2 hurricane conditions to eastern Virginia. Five-minute sustained winds at Cape Henry topped out at 86 mph (139 km/h) while one-minute sustained winds topped out at 128 mph (206 km/h), though the Atlantic Oceanographic and Meteorological Laboratory assessed that the latter value was not in concordance with other observations or may have been "atypical of the circulation of the hurricane". A wind measurement of 134 mph (216 km/h) at Cape Henry nonetheless set a record for the region as the strongest winds measured within both the region and for the state of Virginia overall. Gusts at Cape Henry may have reached as high as 150 mph (240 km/h). A $5 million damage toll inflicted upon crops and a $1 million damage toll inflicted upon property comprised the $6 million damage toll resulting from the hurricane's impacts in Virginia. The hurricane damaged 2,132 buildings and destroyed another 31 according to the Weather Bureau.

The Richmond Times-Dispatch described the storm as one of "unusual violence". Wind gusts in the Hampton Roads area exceeded 80 mph (130 km/h). The Norfolk and Virginia Beach areas were the hardest-hit locales in Virginia. Homes were damaged and telephone and power networks were disrupted in the two cities. The primary power line connecting Norfolk and Virginia Beach was knocked out, along with a Virginia Electric and Power Commission substation in Suffolk. The 200 ft (61 m) transmission tower for the WSAP radio station in Portsmouth was blown down by the hurricane. The scale of the damage was relatively minor in Gloucester and Matthews counties, though the high tides raised by the passing storm forced coastal residents to evacuate to higher ground.

=== New Jersey Shore ===
The hurricane was infamous for the amount of damage it caused along the New Jersey coastline. The shore towns on Long Beach Island, as well as Barnegat, Atlantic City, Ocean City, and Cape May all suffered major damage. Long Beach Island, Barnegat Island and Brigantine all lost their causeways to the mainland in the storm effectively cutting them off from the rest of New Jersey. Additionally both islands lost hundreds of homes, in particular the Harvey Cedars section of Long Beach Island where many homes in the town were swept out to sea.

In Atlantic City the hurricane's storm surge forced water into the lobbies of many of the resorts' famous hotels. The Atlantic City boardwalk suffered major damage along with the Boardwalk Hall Auditorium Organ and the city's famous ocean piers. Both the famed Steel Pier and Heinz Pier were partially destroyed by the hurricane with only the Steel Pier getting rebuilt. Ocean City and Cape May also lost many homes in the storm with Ocean City's boardwalk suffering significant damage. Larry Savadove devotes a whole chapter in his book Great Storms of the Jersey Shore to the hurricane and the imprint and lore it left on the Jersey Shore.

Damage photographed in Atlantic City on 14 September 1944

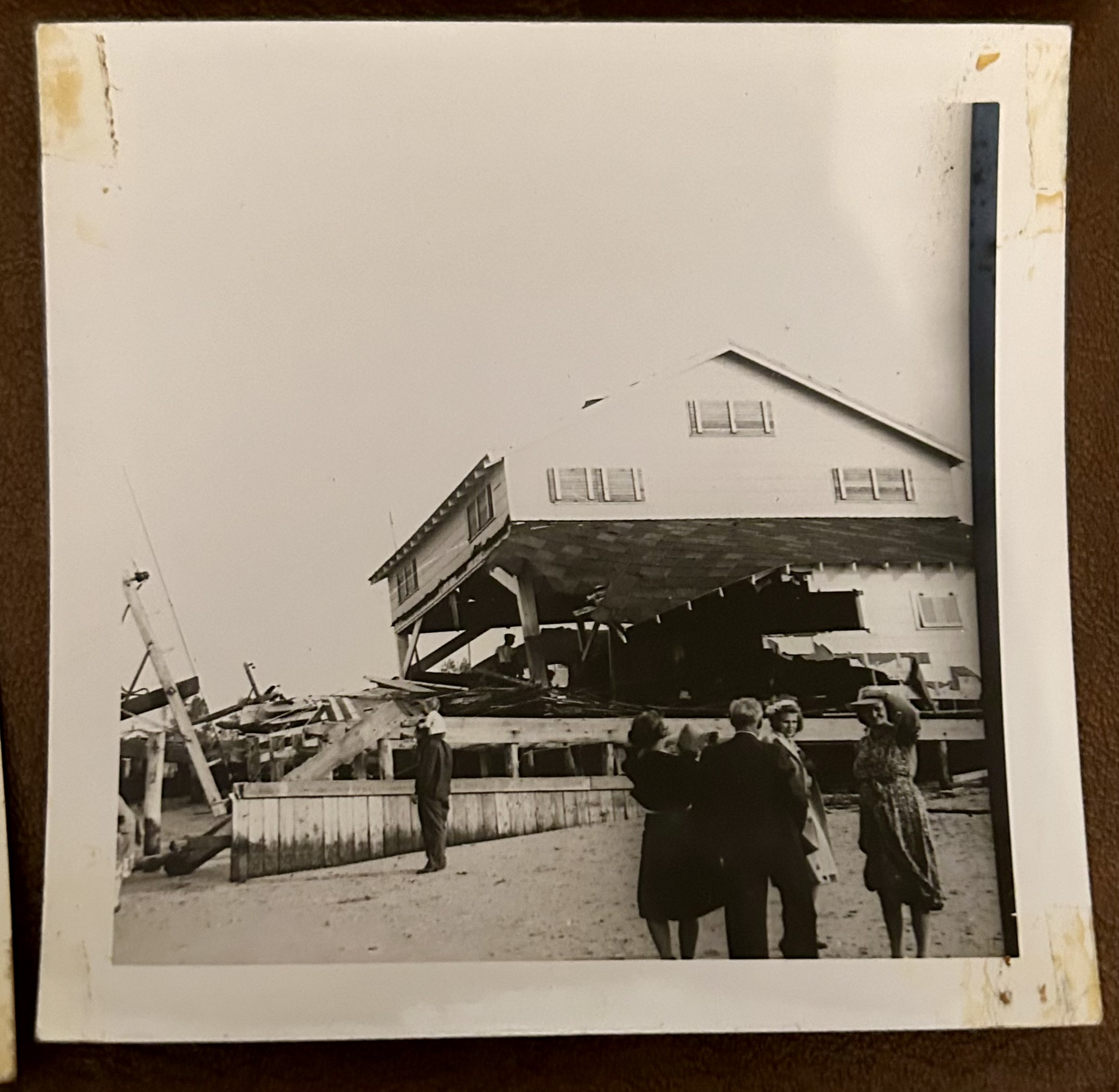

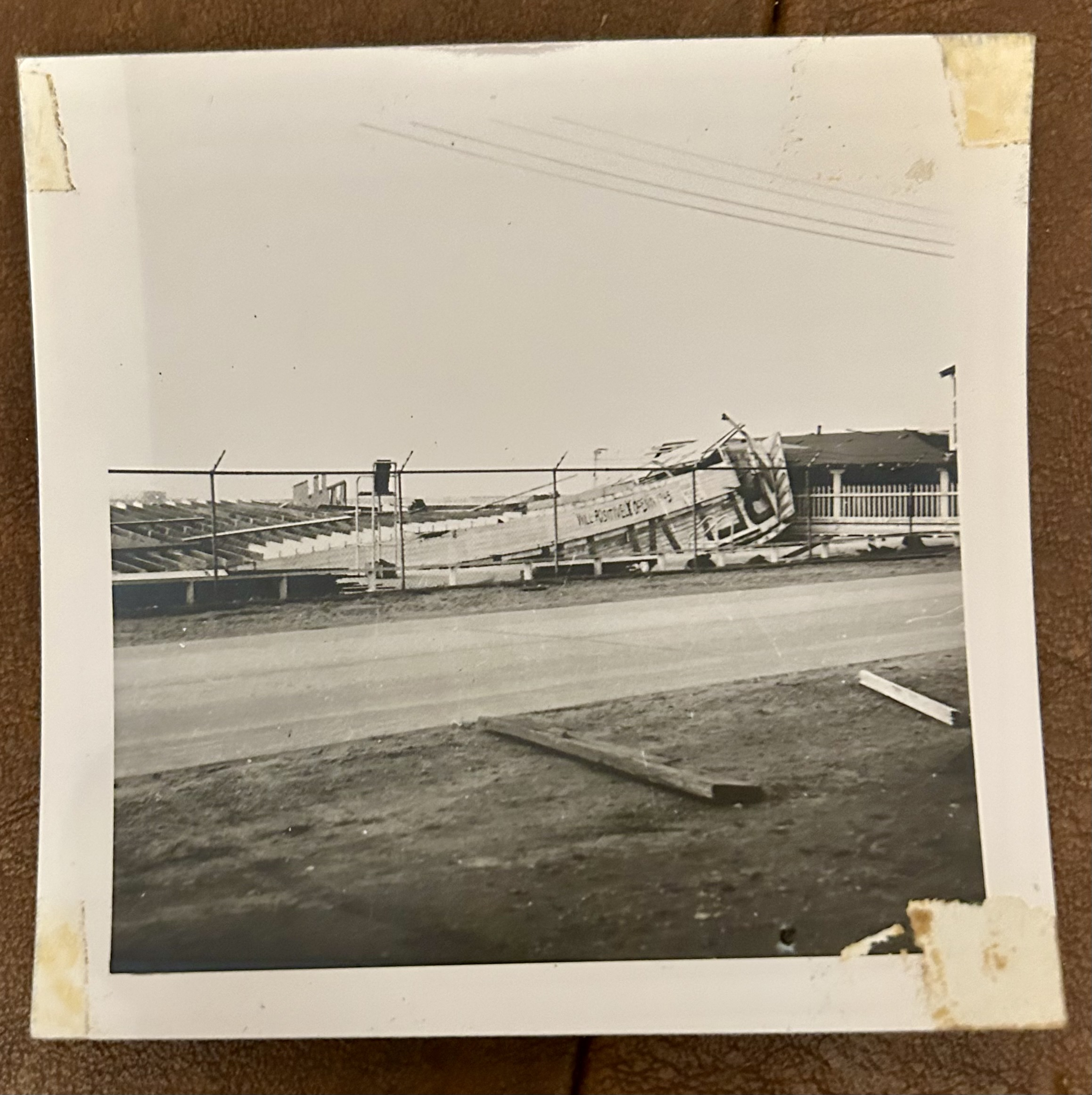
Swimming pool at Belvedere

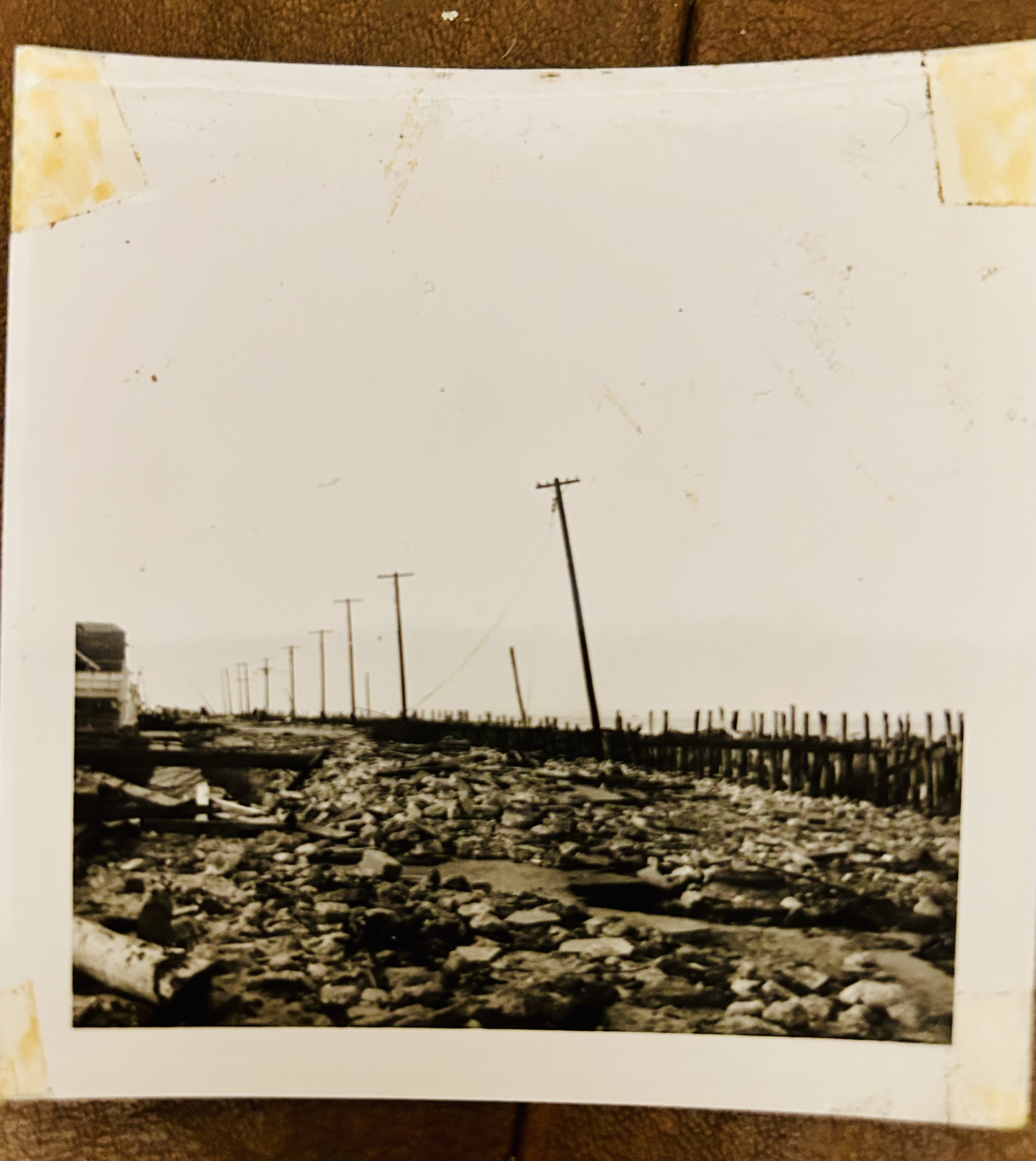
Damage to the boardwalk

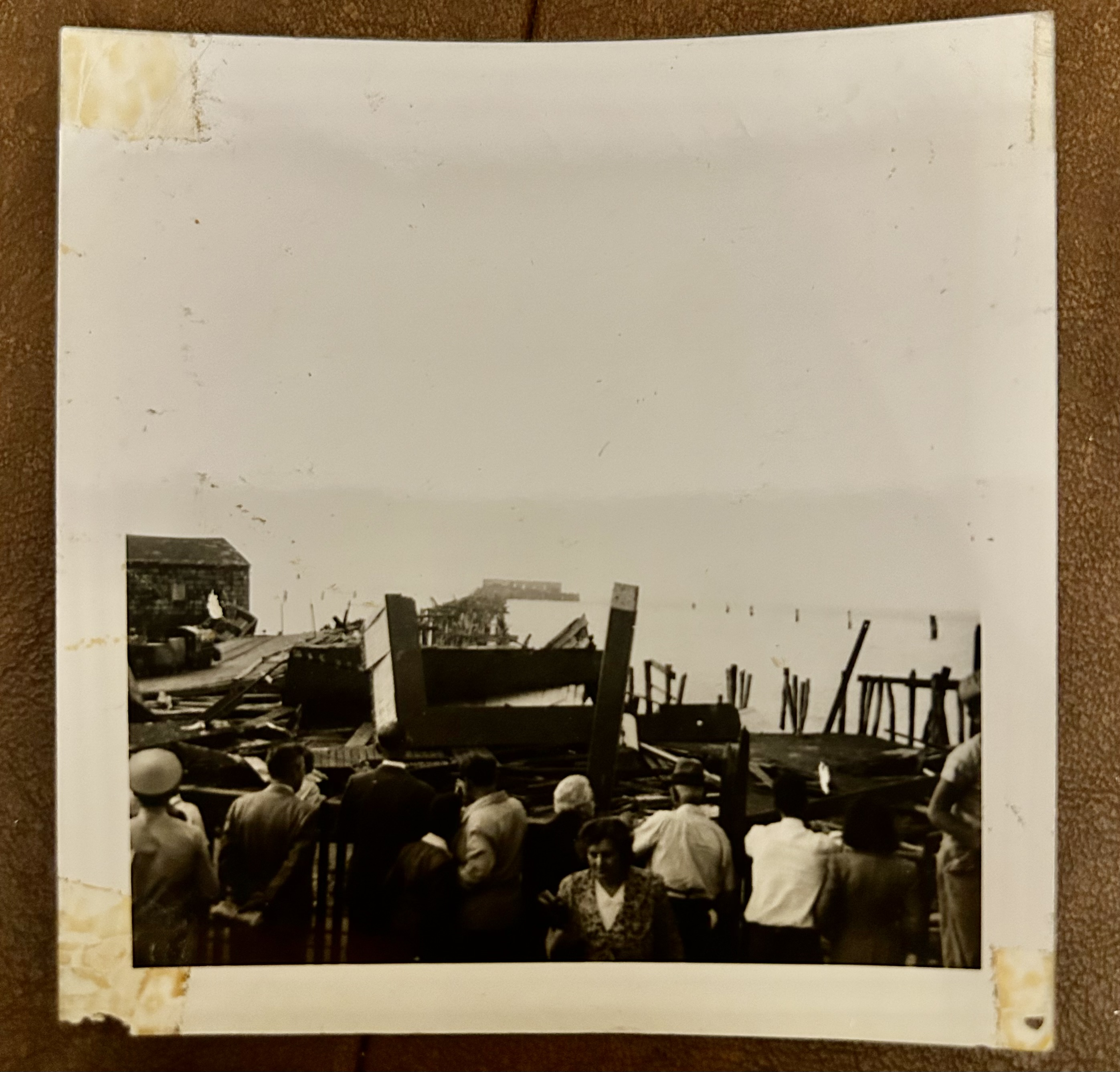
Remains of the steamship pier

=== New England ===
Rain totals of around 7 inches (180 mm) occurred in the Hartford, Connecticut area, and the city of Bridgeport saw the greatest official total at 10.7 inches (270 mm). Tobacco and fruit damage in Connecticut totaled to about $2 million (1944 USD), with similar overall damage costs occurring in Rhode Island. More than $5 million (1944 USD) in damage which occurred on Cape Cod can be attributed to lost boats, as well as fallen trees and utility damage. A total of 28 people died throughout New England as a result of the storm. In Bath, Maine, a 10-year-old boy was electrocuted when he came into contact with downed wires. In Augusta, Maine, a 40-year-old woman was run over by a bicyclist who was blinded by heavy rains. 4.34 inches of rain fell during the storm at Bates College. Many tree limbs were downed by high winds during the storm, and in Androscoggin County, Maine, 40% of the apple crop was destroyed.

Hey Bonnie Hall, the mansion built by Russell Warren for the DeWolf family in Bristol, Rhode Island, was damaged beyond repair and demolished later in 1944.

=== USS Warrington and other ships ===
The storm was also responsible for sinking the Navy destroyer USS Warrington approximately 450 miles (720 km) east of Vero Beach, Florida, with a loss of 248 sailors. The hurricane was one of the most powerful to traverse the Eastern Seaboard, reaching Category 4 when it encountered Warrington, and producing hurricane-force winds over a diameter of 600 miles (970 km). The hurricane also produced waves in excess of 70 feet (21 m) in height. The hurricane and the sinking of USS Warrington are documented in the 1996 book The Dragon's Breath - Hurricane At Sea, written by Commander Robert A. Dawes, Jr. (a former Commanding Officer of Warrington), and published by Naval Institute Press.

In addition to Warrington, the Coast Guard cutters USCGC Bedloe (WSC-128) and USCGC Jackson (WSC-142) both capsized and sank off Cape Hatteras. Seventy-five men managed to escape onto life rafts from Bedloe and Jackson, but only 32 survived the rough seas and subsequent hours of exposure to be rescued two days later. The 136-foot (41 m) minesweeper YMS-409 foundered and sank killing all 33 on board, while the lightship Vineyard Sound (LV-73) was sunk with the loss of all twelve aboard. YAG-17, a full sized attack transport simulator permanently moored in Lynnhaven Roads, near Little Creek, Virginia, was wrecked. Finally, the hurricane drove the SS Thomas Tracy aground in Rehoboth Beach, Delaware.

== See also ==
- List of Category 5 Atlantic hurricanes
- Hurricane Belle
- Hurricane Gloria
- Hurricane Bob
