= A. Crozer Reeves =

American politician (1867–1936)

Member of the New Jersey Senate from the Mercer district
- In office 1926–1936
- Preceded by: William H. Blackwell
- Succeeded by: Crawford Jamieson

Member of the New Jersey General Assembly from the Mercer district
- In office 1925–1925
- Preceded by: George O. Vanderbilt
- Succeeded by: May A. Thropp

Personal details
- Born: December 3, 1867 Bucks County, Pennsylvania
- Died: February 15, 1936 (aged 68) Atlantic City, New Jersey
- Party: Republican

Andrew Crozer Reeves (December 3, 1867 – February 15, 1936) was an American politician who served in the New Jersey General Assembly in 1925 and in the New Jersey Senate from 1926 to 1936.

Reeves was born near Yardley in Bucks County, Pennsylvania in 1867. After his family moved to Mercer County, New Jersey, he was educated at the New Jersey State Model School in Trenton and the Stewart (later Rider) School of Business.

In Trenton, Reeves organized a wholesale grocery firm that was later incorporated as Muschert, Reeves and Company, for which he served as president. He entered the newspaper business, becoming president of the Trenton Times Corporation, publishing the Trenton Evening Times and Trenton Sunday Times-Advertiser. He was also active in farming, serving as the longtime treasurer for the Mercer County Board of Agriculture.

In 1925, Reeves was elected to the New Jersey General Assembly as a Republican from Mercer County, and the following year he was elected to the New Jersey Senate. He twice served as chairman of the Senate Joint Appropriations Committee. Reeves served as Senate majority leader in 1931 and as Senate president in 1932, also serving as Acting Governor. In 1934 he was named president pro tem of the Senate.

On February 15, 1936, Reeves died of a heart attack on the boardwalk in Atlantic City, where he was planning to attend the annual legislative dinner. He was 68 years old.
