= Registration (organ) =

Combination of stops on a pipe organ which produces a particular sound

Registration is the technique of choosing and combining the stops of a pipe organ in order to produce a particular sound. Registration can also refer to a particular combination of stops, which may be recalled through combination action. The registration chosen for a particular piece will be determined by a number of factors, including the composer's indications (if any are given), the time and place in which the piece was composed, the organ the piece is played upon, and the acoustic environment within which the organ resides.

== Pitch and timbre ==
The pitch produced by a pipe is a function of its length. An organ stop may be tuned to sound (or "speak at") the pitch normally associated with the key that is pressed (the "unison pitch"), or it may speak at a fixed interval above or below this pitch (an "octave pitch"). Some stops are tuned to notes "in-between" the octaves and are called "mutations" (see below). The pitch of a rank of pipes is denoted by a number on the stop knob. A stop that speaks at unison pitch (the "native pitch" for that note; the pitch you would hear if you pressed that same key on a piano) is known as an 8′ (pronounced "eight foot") stop. This nomenclature refers to the approximate length of the longest pipe in that rank.

The octave sounded by a given pipe is inversely exponentially proportional to its length (1/2 the length = double the pitch), meaning that a 4′ stop speaks exactly one octave higher than an 8′ stop. Likewise, a 2′ stop speaks exactly one octave higher than a 4′ stop. Conversely, a 16′ stop speaks exactly one octave below an 8′ stop; and a 32′ stop speaks exactly one octave below a 16′ stop. Lengths used in actual organs include 64′, 32′, 16′, 8′, 4′, 2′, 1′, and 1/2′.

Example:

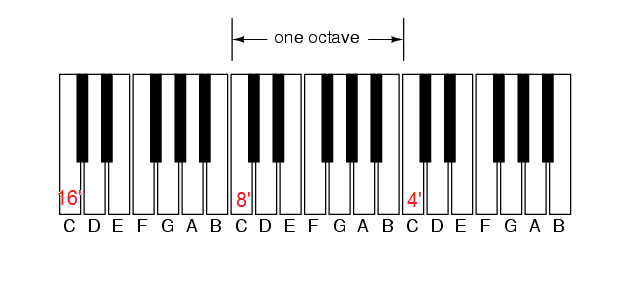

=== Mutations ===
Ranks that do not speak at a unison or octave pitch, but rather at a non-octave interval to the unison pitch, are called mutation stops (or, simply, "mutations"). Because they sound at intervals other than an octave (2:1 ratio) above or below the unison sound, they are rarely used on their own; rather, they are combined with unison stops to create different tone colors.

Like the unison and octave stops, the length label of a mutation stop indicates what pitch the rank sounds. For example, a stop labeled 2 2/3' sounds at the interval of a twelfth (one octave plus a fifth; or 3:1 ratio) above unison pitch. That is, with a 2 2/3' stop drawn, pressing middle C sounds the G that is the 12th diatonic note above.

Mutations usually sound at pitches in the harmonic series of the unison pitch. In some large organs, non-harmonic mutations are occasionally used, sounding pitches from the harmonic series of one or two octaves below unison pitch. Such mutations that sound at the fifth above (or fourth below) the fundamental can create the impression of a stop an octave (or two) lower than the fundamental, especially when low frequencies are involved; these are often called resultants.

Mutations are tuned an exact just interval away from the fundamental, with no beats. (This is not possible in mutation stops unified from other ranks, such as an 8' or 4' rank also used for a 2 2/3' stop.)

=== Mixtures ===
Certain stops called mixtures contain multiple ranks of pipes sounding at consecutive octaves and fifths (and in some cases, thirds) above unison pitch. The number of ranks in a mixture is denoted by a Roman numeral on the stop knob; for example, a stop labeled "Mixture V" would contain five pipes for every note. So for every key pressed, five different pipes sound (all controlled by the same stop).

== National styles of registration ==
In the seventeenth century, national styles of organ building began to emerge. Organs had certain unique characteristics that were common to organs in the country in which they were built. Registration techniques developed that mirrored the characteristics in the organs of each national style.

== Combination action ==
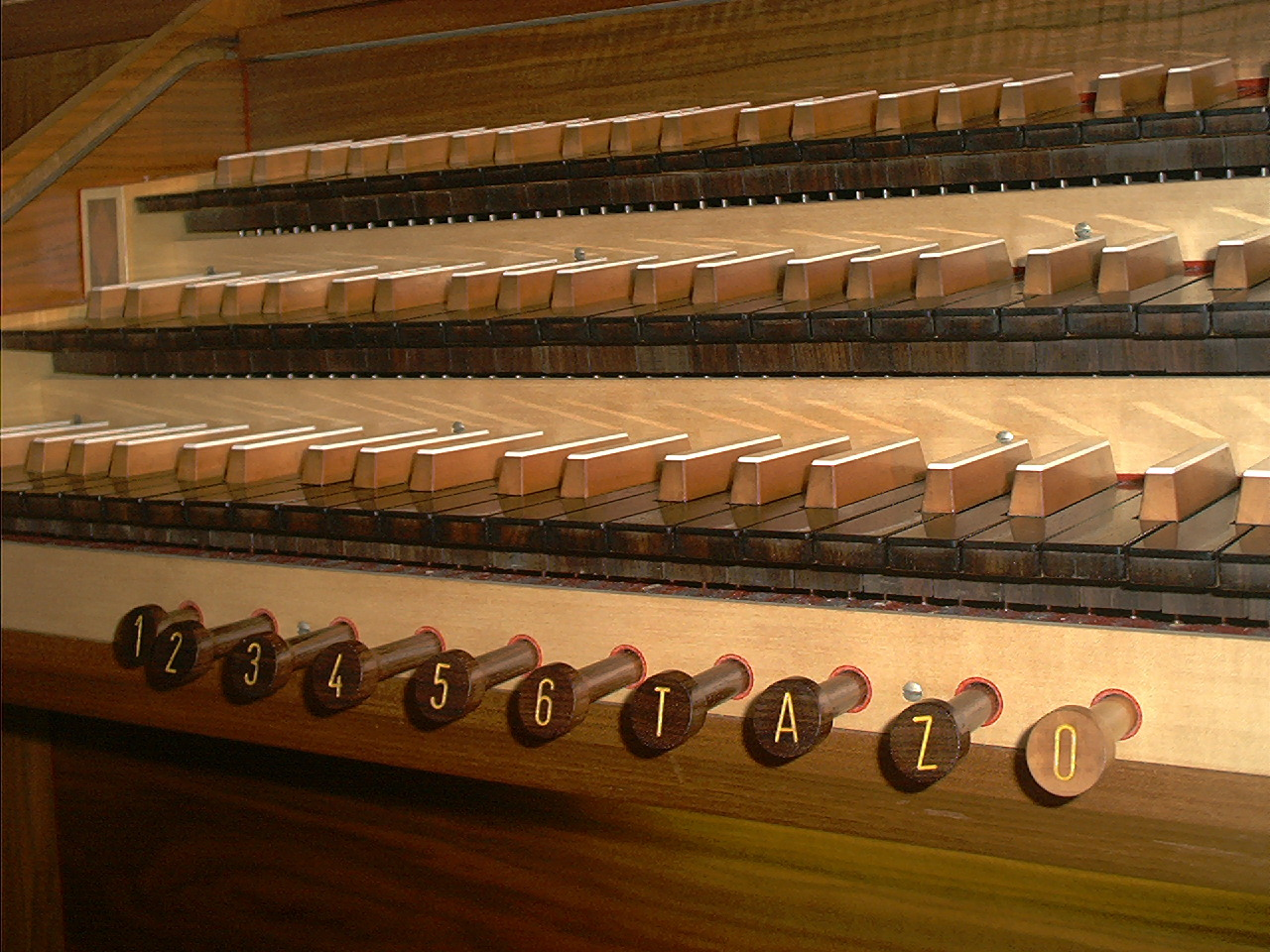
Combination pistons (buttons) on the organ console

A combination action is a system designed to store specific organ registrations to be recalled instantaneously by the player while they are playing. It usually consists of several numbered pistons (buttons) situated in the space between the manuals at the organ console. The pistons control either the stops of the whole organ (in which case they are called general pistons or generals) or the stops of a particular division (in which case they are called divisional pistons or divisionals). Each piston is programmed by the organist with a particular registration to be activated when it is pressed. This allows the organist to change registrations on the fly, without the assistance of a registrant.

=== Mechanical systems ===
Over the years, organ builders have designed various combination action systems. The simplest combination actions are toe studs that move a predetermined combination of stop knobs when pressed. Depending on the way in which the mechanism operates, these toe studs may or may not be reversible (i.e., pressing a toe stud again may or may not turn off the stops that were turned on when it was first pressed). More complex versions of this system are reversible, and furthermore can activate a predetermined registration without moving the stop knobs. Certain large organs of the romantic era (such as the organ built by Friedrich Ladegast for the cathedral in Merseburg, Germany) feature this kind of combination action. Often, the toe studs will be labeled with dynamic markings reflecting the loudness of the registrations which result when they are pressed. For example, an organ may have two of these combinations, one labeled p (for piano, Italian for "soft") and one labeled ff (for fortissimo, Italian for "very strong"). This system allows the organist to set the stops to a specific registration (very quiet, for example) and then suddenly change it for a short period of time (to very loud, for example) simply by pressing the appropriate toe stud. The organist can then return to the original registration by pressing the toe stud again. This is especially helpful when playing the organ works of German romantic composers such as Max Reger and Franz Liszt.

==== Saint-Sulpice ====
The combination action in the organ at the church of Saint-Sulpice in Paris deserves special mention. It was designed by the renowned French organ builder Aristide Cavaillé-Coll. Because the organ predates the advent of electricity, the entire system operates through mechanical and pneumatic means. There are no pistons or toe studs. The combination action consists of six stop knobs, one for each division of the organ, connected to a system of pneumatics. When one of these knobs is pulled, the registration on its respective division may be altered without the stop changes taking effect. When the knob is pushed back in, the new registration sounds. Using this system along with the pédales de combinaison, an organist (and an assistant or two) can prepare elaborate registrations in advance of their use during a performance. Unlike a modern electrical combination action, this system cannot retain combinations to be recalled later; registrations must be prepared on the spot. In spite of its shortcomings (which are apparent only in light of present-day combination actions), it is an ingeniously designed system that was groundbreaking for its time.

=== Early twentieth century ===
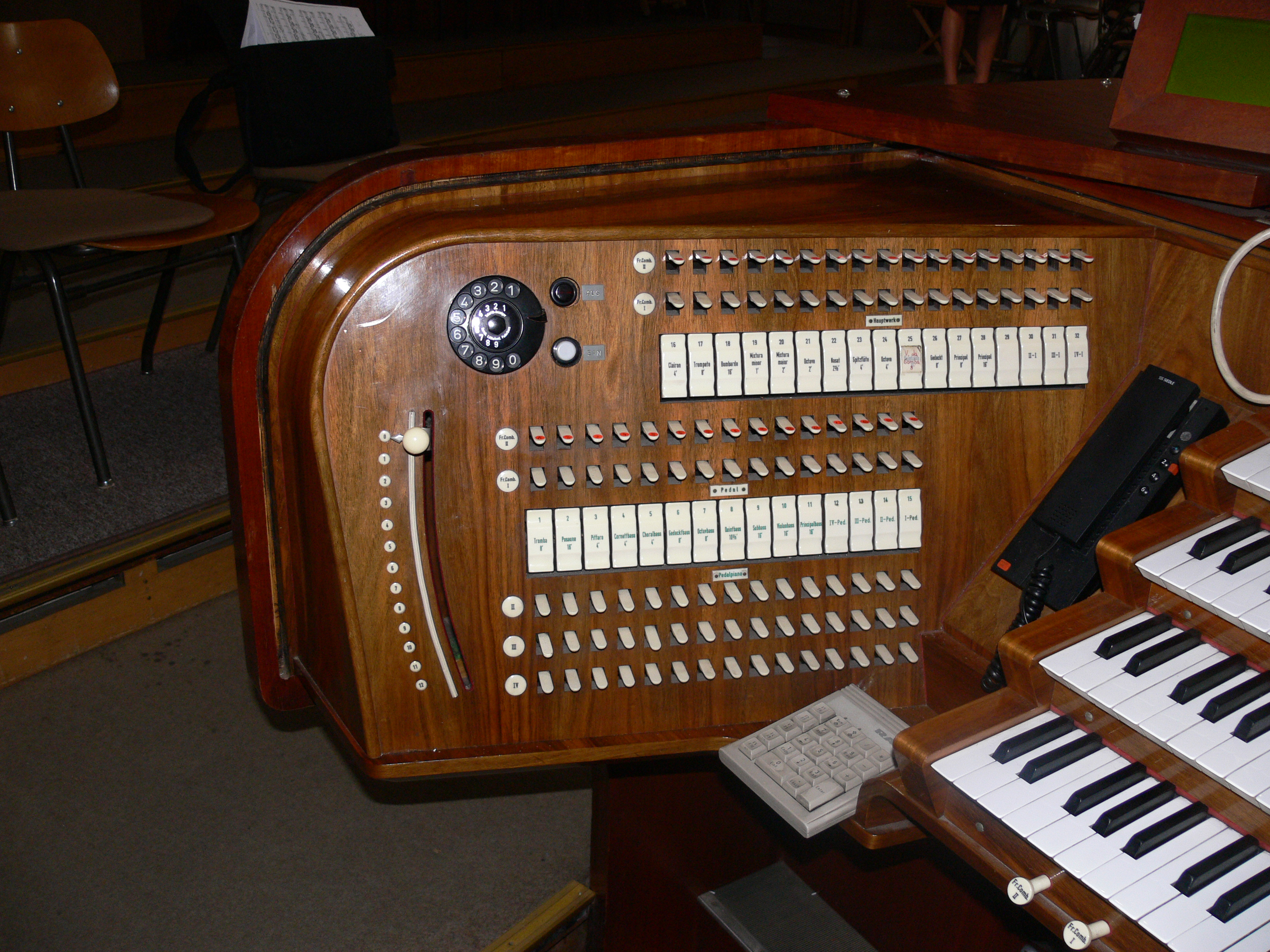
Left-half of setterboards on the console: two rows of register rocker switches for two free combinations per manuals or pedalboard (Organ at the Liebfrauenkirche Ravensburg)

When electricity became commonplace, organ builders realized that it could be used to create more complex and capable combination actions. Large setterboards consisting of a grid of switches were built inside the console or the organ case. The piston numbers formed one axis of the grid, and the stop names formed the other axis. To set a combination, the organist would have to go to the setterboard and flip the switches for each stop corresponding to the desired piston number. This process was quite time-consuming, and in most cases required the organist to leave his position at the console entirely to change even one stop on a piston. Setterboard setups did not always result in the actual stop knobs moving---such a system was called a blind system, and stops added manually during a performance would add to the preset setting. Occasionally provision would be made for Pedal stops to be affected by manual pistons, allowing for a suitable bass.

A more advanced system which is still in use in some organs is the electropneumatic capture system. To set a piston, the organist must press and hold the desired piston while pulling the desired stops. The motion of the stop control sets a mechanical on/off tab or lever on a rocker arm inside the combination action, allowing the configuration to be recalled from the set tabs. Since this "hold-and-set" system depended on manipulation of the stop controls, it was always located within the console. It represented an improvement over the setterboard in that the organist could remain seated at the console while altering registrations. These combination actions were actually early mechanical digital-memory storage devices.

An additional system which was usually used on large instruments was often called "remote capture" (although it could be either in the console or in a remote location). Combinations were set by pressing a "setter" button and then the desired piston. Its advantage over push-and-set was that a carefully worked-out combination could be instantly recorded, without having to push a piston already set to another combination and change it. Neither the setterboard system nor the electropneumatic system is built in new organs today; they have both been supplanted by the modern solid-state combination action.

=== Modern ===
The most widely used combination action in newly built organs has at its heart a system of electronics. The combinations are stored in a computer memory. To set a combination, the organist pulls the desired stops, holds the setter button (usually labeled "Set"), and presses the desired piston. Larger organs, especially in the academic realm, as well as organs played by several organists or guest artists sometimes feature a system of memory levels: each organist is assigned a level or a range of levels and is able to keep his registrations separate from those of other organists who play the instrument. This is especially useful in academic and concert settings, as it makes it unnecessary for organists to write down their registrations and reset the pistons every time they sit down at the organ. Some organs feature a disk drive, enabling the organist to save combinations to a floppy disk or other removable media. More recent ones include a USB port for devices such as flash drives.

=== Sequencers ===
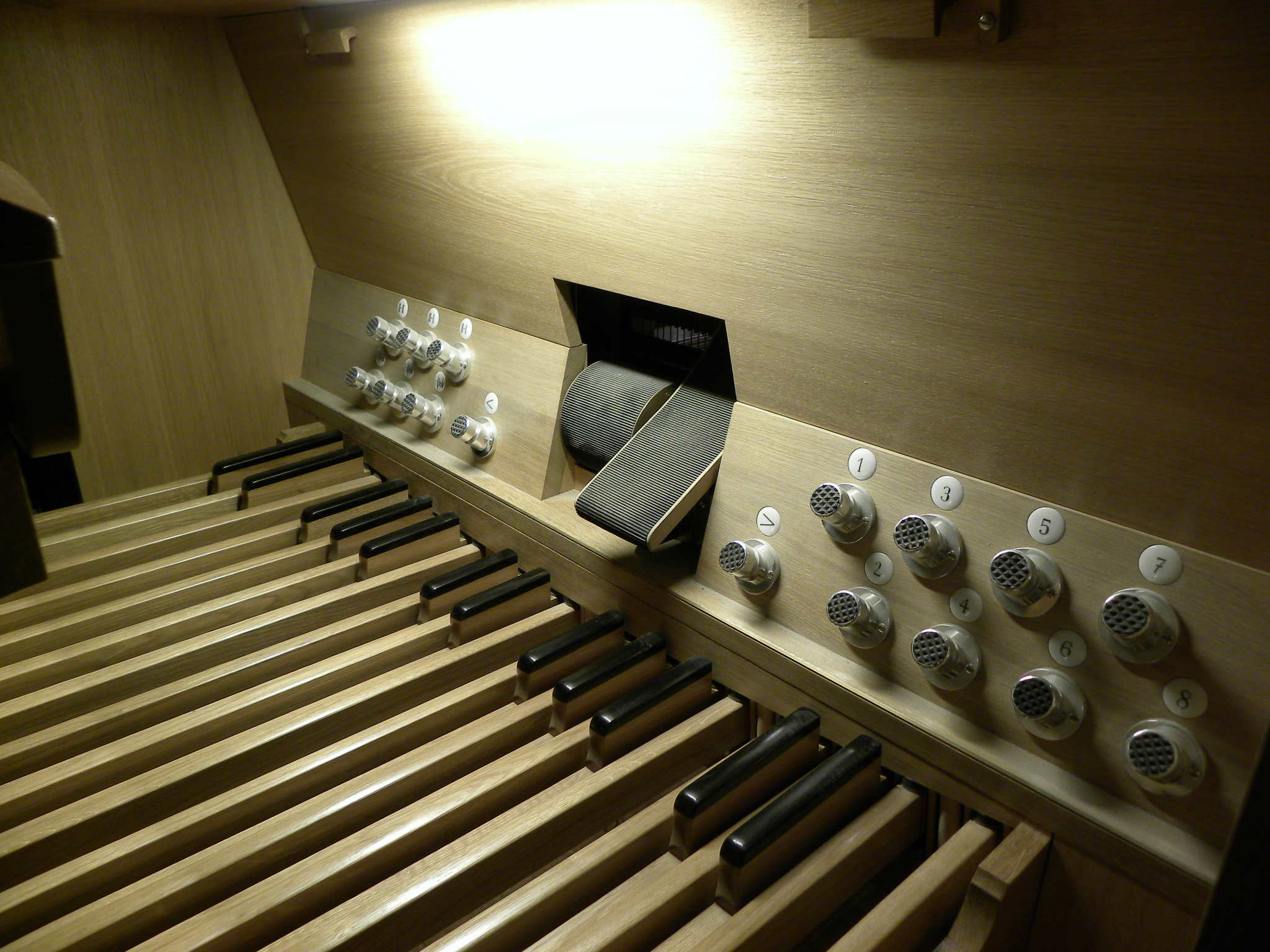
Toe studs (pistons) on the console: center: Sequencers "<" and ">" right: Combinations "1"~"8"

In recent times, sequencers have become an integral part of combination actions, primarily on large organs. A sequencer allows an organist to program a list of registration changes and advance through it by pressing a piston labeled "+" (or regress through it using a "–" piston). It becomes unnecessary for the organist to push the proper piston; he must only press the "+" piston and the next registration in the sequence will be activated. Some sequencers have an "all pistons plus" feature, which makes all the pistons on the console (excepting the General Cancel and the "–" pistons) function like the "+" piston; in this case the organist can press any piston which is in convenient reach to advance through the sequence.

Adding a piston change in the midst of an already established sequence of stop changes is difficult or not possible with some sequencing systems.

Using a sequencer can remove many of the complications related to changing registrations during a performance that have traditionally plagued organists.

== See also ==
- Organ pipe
