= Boardwalk Hall Auditorium Organ stoplist =

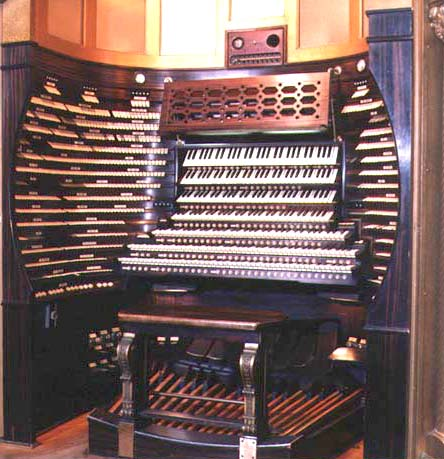
Boardwalk Hall Auditorium Organ console

This is a list of stops (tone selections) for the Boardwalk Hall Auditorium Organ, the largest pipe organ in the world as measured by number of pipes. The organ is located in the main auditorium of Boardwalk Hall in Atlantic City, New Jersey. The organ was built by the Midmer-Losh Organ Company from 1929 to 1932.

== Speaking stops ==
Most of the speaking stops are assigned to one of the seven manuals or to the pedals. The remainder are "floating" stops that can be assigned to one or more manuals. The stops are grouped into "divisions", with each division providing a different collection of sounds. The "pitch" of the stop indicates the nominal length of the pipe that sounds when the key for C two octaves below middle C is pressed.

As of 2024, after years of restoration work, approximately two-thirds of the instrument is operational. Extensive details are provided at the restoration website. (NOTE: this pipe organ has no façade)

Manual	Division	#	Name	Pitch	Pressure	Location	Other information
Pedal	Pedal right	20	Contra Diaphone	128	46”	Right stage	Resultant
Pedal	Pedal right	21	Gravississima	64	35”	Right stage	resultant
Pedal	Pedal right	17	Diaphone	64	35"	Right stage	from Dulzian
Pedal	Pedal right	21	Sub Principal	32	20"	Right stage	from Sub Principal, Great
Pedal	Pedal right	1	Contra Tibia	32	20"	Right stage	extended
Pedal	Pedal right	1	Tibia Quint	21 1/3	20"	Right stage	ext. Tibia Clausa
Pedal	Pedal right	2	Diaphone Phonon	16	50"	Right stage	extended
Pedal	Pedal right	4	Principal	16	30"	Right stage	extended
Pedal	Pedal right	21	Diapason	16	20"	Right stage	from Sub Principal, Great
Pedal	Pedal right	22	Diapason	16	20"	Right stage	from Double Diapason I, Great
Pedal	Pedal right	82	Geigen Principal	16	15"	Right stage	from Geigen Diapason, Great-Solo
Pedal	Pedal right	3	Tibia Major	16	30"	Right stage	extended
Pedal	Pedal right	59	Major Flute	16	30"	Right stage	from Major Flute, Solo
Pedal	Pedal right	81	Wald Flute	16	15"	Right stage	from Wald Flute, Great-Solo
Pedal	Pedal right	1	Grand Bourdon	16	20"	Right stage	ext. Contra Tibia Clausa
Pedal	Pedal right	83	Tibia Clausa	16	15"	Right stage	from Tibia Clausa, Great-Solo
Pedal	Pedal right	5	Viol	16	30"	Right stage	extended
Pedal	Pedal right	6	Gross Tierce	12 4/5	20"	Right stage	extended
Pedal	Pedal right	2	Diaphone Quint	10 2/3	50"	Right stage	ext. Diaphone Phonon
Pedal	Pedal right	4	Principal Quint	10 2/3	30"	Right stage	ext. Principal
Pedal	Pedal right	3	Tibia Quint	10 2/3	30"	Right stage	ext. Tibia Major
Pedal	Pedal right	1	Tibia Quint	10 2/3	20"	Right stage	ext. Contra Tibia Clausa
Pedal	Pedal right	83	Minor Quint	10 2/3	15"	Right stage	from Tibia Clausa, Great-Solo
Pedal	Pedal right	7	Septieme	9 1/7	20"	Right stage	extended
Pedal	Pedal right	4	Octave Principal	8	30"	Right stage	ext. Principal
Pedal	Pedal right	22	Octave Major	8	20"	Right stage	from Double Diapason I, Great
Pedal	Pedal right	85	Octave Diapason	8	15"	Right stage	from Horn Diapason, Great-Solo
Pedal	Pedal right	82	Octave Geigen	8	15"	Right stage	from Geigen Diapason, Great-Solo
Pedal	Pedal right	87	Gross Gemshorn	8	15"	Right stage	from Gemshorn, Great-Solo
Pedal	Pedal right	3	Tibia Major	8	30"	Right stage	ext. Tibia Major
Pedal	Pedal right	1	Tibia Clausa	8	20"	Right stage	ext. Contra Tibia Clausa
Pedal	Pedal right	86	Doppel Gedeckt	8	15"	Right stage	from Doppel Gedeckt, Great-Solo
Pedal	Pedal right	5	Octave Viol	8	30"	Right stage	ext. Viol
Pedal	Pedal right	6	Gross Tierce	6 2/5	20"	Right stage	ext. Gross Tierce
Pedal	Pedal right	4	Principal Quint	5 1/3	30"	Right stage	ext. Principal
Pedal	Pedal right	3	Tibia Quint	5 1/3	30"	Right stage	ext. Tibia Major
Pedal	Pedal right	1	Tibia Quint	5 1/3	20"	Right stage	ext. Contra Tibia Clausa
Pedal	Pedal right	7	Gross Septieme	4 4/7	20"	Right stage	ext. Septieme
Pedal	Pedal right	4	Super Octave	4	30"	Right stage	ext. Principal
Pedal	Pedal right	85	Fifteenth	4	15"	Right stage	from Horn Diapason, Great-Solo
Pedal	Pedal right	3	Tibia Fifteenth	4	30"	Right stage	ext. Tibia Major
Pedal	Pedal right	1	Flute Fifteenth	4	20"	Right stage	ext. Contra Tibia Clausa
Pedal	Pedal right	5	Viol Fifteenth	4	30"	Right stage	ext. Viol
Pedal	Pedal right	6	Tierce	3 1/5	20"	Right stage	ext. Gross Tierce
Pedal	Pedal right	3	Tibia Major Nineteenth	2 2/3	30"	Right stage	ext. Tibia Major
Pedal	Pedal right	1	Flute Nineteenth	2 2/3	20"	Right stage	ext. Contra Tibia Clausa
Pedal	Pedal right	5	Viol Nineteenth	2 2/3	30"	Right stage	ext. Viol
Pedal	Pedal right	7	Septieme	2 2/7	20"	Right stage	ext. Septieme
Pedal	Pedal right	3	Tibia Twenty-Second	2	30"	Right stage	ext. Tibia Major
Pedal	Pedal right	81	Flageolet	2	15"	Right stage	from Wald Flute, Great-Solo
Pedal	Pedal right	6	Octave Tierce	1 3/5	20"	Right stage	ext. Gross Tierce
Pedal	Pedal right	3	Tibia Twenty-Sixth	1 1/3	30"	Right stage	ext. Tibia Major
Pedal	Pedal right	7	Octave Septieme	1 1/7	20"	Right stage	ext. Septieme
Pedal	Pedal right	1	Flute Twenty-Ninth	1	20"	Right stage	ext. Contra Tibia Clausa
Pedal	Pedal right		Mixture	XI	15"	Right stage	from various Great-Solo ranks
Pedal	Pedal right		Reed Mixture	V	15"	Right stage	from various Great-Solo ranks
Pedal	Pedal right	17	Dulzian	64	35"	Right stage	ext. Dulzian
Pedal	Pedal right	17	Contra Dulzquint	42 2/3	35"	Right stage	ext. Dulzian
Pedal	Pedal right	8	Contra Bombardon	32	35"	Right stage	ext. Bombardon
Pedal	Pedal right	17	Contra Dulzian	32	35"	Right stage	ext. Dulzian
Pedal	Pedal right	17	Dulzian Quint	21 1/3	35"	Right stage	ext. Dulzian
Pedal	Pedal right	9	Grand Ophicleide	16	100"	Right stage	extended
Pedal	Pedal right	73	Tuba Magna	16	50"	Right stage	from Tuba Magna, Solo
Pedal	Pedal right	8	Bombardon	16	35"	Right stage	extended
Pedal	Pedal right	74	Trumpet Profunda	16	30"	Right stage	from Trumpet Profunda, Solo
Pedal	Pedal right	17	Dulzian	16	35"	Right stage	extended
Pedal	Pedal right	10	Trumpet	16	20"	Right stage	extended
Pedal	Pedal right	96	Saxophone	16	15"	Right stage	from Saxophone, Great-Solo
Pedal	Pedal right	98	French Horn	16	15"	Right stage	from French Horn, Great-Solo
Pedal	Pedal right	97	English Horn	16	15"	Right stage	from English Horn, Great-Solo
Pedal	Pedal right	95	Oboe Horn	16	15"	Right stage	from Oboe Horn, Great-Solo
Pedal	Pedal right	100	Krummhorn	16	15"	Right stage	from Krummhorn, Great-Solo
Pedal	Pedal right	99	Vox Baryton	16	15"	Right stage	from Vox Baryton, Great-Solo
Pedal	Pedal right	8	Bombard Quint	10 2/3	35"	Right stage	ext. Bombardon
Pedal	Pedal right	17	Dulzian Quint	10 2/3	35"	Right stage	ext. Dulzian
Pedal	Pedal right	9	Ophicleide	8	100"	Right stage	ext. Grand Ophicleide
Pedal	Pedal right	78	Bugle	8	50"	Right stage	from Bugle, Solo
Pedal	Pedal right	8	Octave Bombardon	8	35"	Right stage	ext. Bombardon
Pedal	Pedal right	17	Octave Dulzian	8	35"	Right stage	ext. Dulzian
Pedal	Pedal right	100	Octave Krummhorn	8	15"	Right stage	from Krummhorn, Great-Solo
Pedal	Pedal right	99	Vox Baryton	8	15"	Right stage	from Vox Baryton, Great-Solo
Pedal	Pedal right	8	Bombardon Quint	5 1/3	35"	Right stage	ext. Bombardon
Pedal	Pedal right	10	Trumpet Quint	5 1/3	20"	Right stage	ext. Trumpet
Pedal	Pedal right	17	Dulzian Fifteenth	4	35"	Right stage	ext. Dulzian
Pedal	Pedal right	10	Trumpet Fifteenth	4	10"	Right stage	ext. Trumpet
Pedal	Pedal left	11	Diaphone	32	50"	Left stage	ext. Diaphone
Pedal	Pedal left	12	Diapason	32	20"	Left stage	ext. Diapason
Pedal	Pedal left	11	Diaphone	16	50"	Left stage	extended
Pedal	Pedal left	13	Diaphonic Diapason	16	35"	Left stage	extended
Pedal	Pedal left	320	Major Diapason	16	20"	Left stage	
Pedal	Pedal left	12	Diapason	16	20"	Left stage	extended
Pedal	Pedal left	117	Diapason	16	15"	Left stage	from Double Diapason, Swell
Pedal	Pedal left	15	Tibia Clausa	16	20"	Left stage	extended
Pedal	Pedal left	147	Doppel Gedeckt	16	15"	Left stage	from Doppel Gedeckt, Swell-Choir
Pedal	Pedal left	311	Stopped Diapason	16	10"	Left stage	from Stopped Diapason, Swell-Choir
Pedal	Pedal left	14	Bass Viol	16	20"	Left stage	extended
Pedal	Pedal left	254	Bass Viol	16	25"	Left stage	from Contra Basso, String I
Pedal	Pedal left	131	Bass Gamba	16	15"	Left stage	from Contra Gamba, Swell
Pedal	Pedal left	148	Cone Gamba	16	15"	Left stage	from Cone Gamba, Swell-Choir
Pedal	Pedal left	12	Quint Diapason	10 2/3	10"	Left stage	ext. Diapason
Pedal	Pedal left	311	Stopped Quint	10 2/3	10"	Left stage	from Stopped Diapason, Swell-Choir
Pedal	Pedal left	148	Cone Quint	10 2/3	15"	Left stage	from Cone Gamba, Swell-Choir
Pedal	Pedal left	11	Octave Diaphone	8	50"	Left stage	ext. Diahone
Pedal	Pedal left	13	Octave Phonon	8	35"	Left stage	ext. Diaphonic Diapason
Pedal	Pedal left	15	Gross Flute	8	20"	Left stage	ext. Tibia Clausa
Pedal	Pedal left	152	Octave Gemshorn	8	15"	Left stage	from Gemshorn, Swell-Choir
Pedal	Pedal left	149	Flute Clarabella	8	15"	Left stage	from Clarabella, Swell-Choir
Pedal	Pedal left	14	Cello	8	20"	Left stage	ext. Bass Viol
Pedal	Pedal left	155	Terz	6 2/5	10"	Left stage	from Third, Swell-Choir
Pedal	Pedal left	155	Twelfth	5 1/3	10"	Left stage	from Fifth, Swell-Choir
Pedal	Pedal left	155	Octave Septieme	4 4/7	10"	Left stage	from Seventh, Swell-Choir
Pedal	Pedal left	11	Fife	4	50"	Left stage	ext. Diaphone
Pedal	Pedal left	12	Super Octave	4	20"	Left stage	ext. Diapason
Pedal	Pedal left	152	Gemshorn Fifteenth	4	15"	Left stage	from Gemshorn, Swell-Choir
Pedal	Pedal left	15	Flute Fifteenth	4	20"	Left stage	ext. Tibia Clausa
Pedal	Pedal left	155	Tierce	3 1/5	10"	Left stage	from Third, Swell-Choir
Pedal	Pedal left	155	Nineteenth	2 2/3	10"	Left stage	from Fifth, Swell-Choir
Pedal	Pedal left	155	Twenty-First	2 2/7	10"	Left stage	from Seventh, Swell-Choir
Pedal	Pedal left	12	Twenty-Second	2	20"	Left stage	ext. Diapason
Pedal	Pedal left	152	Gemshorn Twenty-Second	2	15"	Left stage	from Gemshorn, Swell-Choir
Pedal	Pedal left	15	Fife	2	20"	Left stage	ext. Tibia Clausa
Pedal	Pedal left	15	Twenty-Ninth	1	20"	Left stage	ext. Tibia Clausa
Pedal	Pedal left	16	Stentor Sesquialtera	VII	20"	Left stage	
Pedal	Pedal left		Grave Mixture	VI	15"	Left stage	from various Swell-Choir ranks
Pedal	Pedal left	18	Contra Bombard	32	50"	Left stage	ext. Bombard
Pedal	Pedal left	19	Fagotto	32	20"	Left stage	ext. Fagotto
Pedal	Pedal left	20	Major Posaune	16	50"	Left stage	extended
Pedal	Pedal left	18	Bombard	16	50"	Left stage	extended
Pedal	Pedal left	138	Trumpet	16	30"	Left stage	from Double Trumpet, Swell
Pedal	Pedal left	142	Horn	16	15"	Left stage	from Double Horn, Swell
Pedal	Pedal left	19	Fagotto	16	20"	Left stage	extended
Pedal	Pedal left	160	Oboe	16	15"	Left stage	from Oboe, Swell-Choir
Pedal	Pedal left	161	Bass Clarinet	16	15"	Left stage	from Clarinet, Swell-Choir
Pedal	Pedal left	162	Vox Humana	16	15"	Left stage	from Vox Humana, Swell-Choir
Pedal	Pedal left	20	Major Posaune	8	50"	Left stage	ext. Major Posaune
Pedal	Pedal left	18	Octave Bombard	8	50"	Left stage	ext. Bombard
Pedal	Pedal left	19	Octave Fagotto	8	20"	Left stage	ext. Fagotto
Pedal	Pedal left	160	Octave Oboe	8	15"	Left stage	from Oboe, Swell-Choir
Pedal	Pedal left	161	Octave Clarinet	8	15"	Left stage	from Clarinet, Swell-Choir
Pedal	Pedal left	19	Horn Twelfth	5 1/3	20"	Left stage	ext. Fagotto
Pedal	Pedal left	18	Bombard Fifteenth	4	50"	Left stage	ext. Bombard
Pedal	Pedal left	19	Horn Fifteenth	4	20"	Left stage	ext. Fagotto
Pedal	Pedal left	160	Oboe Fifteenth	4	15"	Left stage	from Oboe, Swell-Choir
Pedal	Pedal left	19	Horn Nineteenth	2 2/3	20"	Left stage	ext. Fagotto
Pedal	Pedal left	19	Fagotto Twenty-Second	2	20"	Left stage	ext. Fagotto
Pedal	Pedal right gallery	298	Contra Violone	32	25"	Right upper	from Violone, Echo
Pedal	Pedal right gallery	233	Diaphone	16	25"	Right center	from Diaphone, Gallery I
Pedal	Pedal right gallery	242	Flute Maggiore	16	25"	Right center	from Flauto Maggiore, Gallery II
Pedal	Pedal right gallery	214	Spire Flute	16	15"	Right upper	from Spire Flute, Echo
Pedal	Pedal right gallery	220	Flute Bourdon	16	15"	Right upper	from Clarabella, Echo
Pedal	Pedal right gallery	298	Contra Violone	16	25"	Right upper	from Violone, Echo
Pedal	Pedal right gallery	265	Double Bass	16	15"	Right forward	from Double Bass, String II
Pedal	Pedal right gallery	266	Contra Bass	16	15"	Right forward	from Contra Bass, String II
Pedal	Pedal right gallery	267	Contra Viole	16	15"	Right forward	from Contra Viole, String II
Pedal	Pedal right gallery	213	Contra Gamba	16	15"	Right upper	from Gamba, Echo
Pedal	Pedal right gallery	220	Flute Quint	10 2/3	15"	Right upper	from Clarabella, Echo
Pedal	Pedal right gallery	298	Violone	8	25"	Right upper	from Violone, Echo
Pedal	Pedal right gallery	298	Violone	4	25"	Right upper	from Violone, Echo
Pedal	Pedal right gallery	235	Trumpet Sonora	16	100"	Right center	from Trumpet Mirabilis, Gallery I
Pedal	Pedal right gallery	231	Tuba d'Amour	16	25"	Right upper	from Tuba d'Amour, Echo
Pedal	Pedal right gallery	226	Contra Bassoon	16	15"	Right upper	from Bassoon, Echo
Pedal	Pedal right gallery	227	Chalumeau	16	15"	Right upper	from Clarinet, Echo
Pedal	Pedal right gallery	230	Vox Humana	16	15"	Right upper	from Vox Humana II, Echo
Pedal	Pedal right gallery	226	Bassoon	8	15"	Right upper	from Bassoon, Echo
Pedal	Pedal left gallery	236	Grand Diapason	16	20"	Left center	from Contra Diapason, Gallery III
Pedal	Pedal left gallery	171	Dulciana	16	10"	Left forward	from Dulciana, Choir
Pedal	Pedal left gallery	197	Major Flauto	16	20"	Left upper	from Major Flute, Fanfare
Pedal	Pedal left gallery	176	Double Melodia	16	10"	Left forward	from Melodia, Choir
Pedal	Pedal left gallery	176	Melodia	8	10"	Left forward	from Melodia, Choir
Pedal	Pedal left gallery	299	Contra Trombone	32	35"	Left upper	from Trombone, Fanfare
Pedal	Pedal left gallery	205	Posaune	16	50"	Left upper	from Posaune, Fanfare
Pedal	Pedal left gallery	299	Trombone	16	35"	Left upper	from Trombone, Fanfare
Pedal	Pedal left gallery	206	Bombardon	16	35"	Left upper	from Bombardon, Fanfare
Pedal	Pedal left gallery	188	Trombone	16	25"	Left forward	from Contra Tromba, Choir
Pedal	Pedal left gallery	249	Saxophone	16	25"	Left center	from Saxophone, Gallery IV
Pedal	Pedal left gallery	209	Tromba Quint	10 2/3	20"	Left upper	from Tromba Quint, Fanfare
Pedal	Pedal left gallery	299	Trombone	8	35"	Left upper	from Trombone, Fanfare
Pedal	Pedal left gallery	188	Tromba	8	25"	Left forward	from Contra Tromba, Choir
Pedal	Pedal left gallery	210	Tromba Tierce	6 2/5	20"	Left upper	from Tromba Tierce, Fanfare
Pedal	Pedal left gallery	209	Tromba Quint	5 1/3	20"	Left upper	from Tromba Quint, Fanfare
Pedal	Pedal left gallery	210	Tromba Seventeenth	3 1/5	20"	Left upper	from Tromba Tierce, Fanfare
Choir	Unenclosed choir	165	Quintaton	16	3 1/2"	Left stage	
Choir	Unenclosed choir	166	Diapason	8	3 1/2"	Left stage	
Choir	Unenclosed choir	167	Holz Flute	8	3 1/2"	Left stage	
Choir	Unenclosed choir	168	Octave	4	3 1/2"	Left stage	
Choir	Unenclosed choir	169	Fifteenth	2	3 1/2"	Left stage	
Choir	Unenclosed choir	170	Rausch Quint 12–15	II	3 1/2"	Left stage	Used with Scharf Mixture 19–22
Choir	Unenclosed choir	170	Scharf Mixture 19–22	II	3 1/2"	Left stage	Used with Rausch Quint 12–15
Pedal	Pedal second touch	17	Diaphone	64	35"	Right stage	from Dulzian, Pedal Right
Pedal	Pedal second touch	11	Diaphone	32	50"	Left stage	from Diaphone, Pedal Left
Pedal	Pedal second touch	13	Diaphonic Diapason	16	35"	Left stage	from Diaphonic Diapason, Pedal Left
Pedal	Pedal second touch	3	Tibia Major	16	30"	Right stage	from Tibia Major, Pedal Right
Pedal	Pedal second touch	5	Contra Viol	16	30"	Right stage	from Viol, Pedal Right
Pedal	Pedal second touch	3	Tibia Major	8	30"	Right stage	from Tibia Major, Pedal Right
Pedal	Pedal second touch	5	Viol	8	30"	Right stage	from Viol, Pedal Right
Pedal	Pedal second touch	3	Tibia Major	4	30"	Right stage	from Tibia Major, Pedal Right
Pedal	Pedal second touch	5	Viol	4	30"	Right stage	from Viol, Pedal Right
Pedal	Pedal second touch	17	Dulzian	64	35"	Right stage	from Dulzian, Pedal Right
Pedal	Pedal second touch	18	Contra Bombard	32	50"	Left stage	from Bombard, Pedal Left
Pedal	Pedal second touch	8	Contra Bombardon	32	35"	Right stage	from Bombard, Pedal Right
Pedal	Pedal second touch	9	Ophicleide	16	100"	Right stage	from Grand Ophicleide, Pedal Right
Pedal	Pedal second touch	20	Posaune	16	50"	Left stage	from Major Posaune, Pedal Left
Pedal	Pedal second touch	18	Bombard	16	50"	Left stage	from Bombard, Pedal Left
Pedal	Pedal second touch	8	Bombardon	16	35"	Right stage	from Bombardon, Pedal Right
Pedal	Pedal second touch	9	Ophicleide	8	100"	Right stage	from Grand Ophicleide, Pedal Right
Pedal	Pedal second touch	20	Posaune	8	50"	Left stage	from Major Posaune, Pedal Left
Pedal	Pedal second touch	8	Bombardon	8	35"	Right stage	from Bombardon, Pedal Right
Pedal	Pedal second touch	17	Dulzian	8	35"	Right stage	from Dulzian, Pedal Right
Pedal	Pedal second touch	18	Bombard	4	50"	Left stage	from Bombard, Pedal Left
Pedal	Pedal second touch	17	Dulzian	4	35"	Right stage	from Dulzian, Pedal Right
Pedal	Pedal second touch	108	Chimes	8		Left forward	from Great-Solo
Choir	Choir	171	Contra Dulciana	16	10"	Left forward	ext. Dulciana
Choir	Choir	176	Contra Melodia	16	10"	Left forward	ext. Melodia
Choir	Choir	172	Diapason I	8	10"	Left forward	
Choir	Choir	173	Diapason II	8	10"	Left forward	
Choir	Choir	171	Dulciana	8	10"	Left forward	extended
Choir	Choir	174	Dulciana Celeste	8	10"	Left forward	
Choir	Choir	184	Gemshorn	8	10"	Left forward	
Choir	Choir	185	Gemshorn Celeste	8	10"	Left forward	
Choir	Choir	176	Melodia	8	10"	Left forward	extended
Choir	Choir	177	Philomela	8	10"	Left forward	
Choir	Choir	178	Concert Flute	8	10"	Left forward	
Choir	Choir	179	Unda Maris	8	10"	Left forward	
Choir	Choir	308	Nachthorn	8	10"	Left forward	
Choir	Choir	186	Viola Pomposa	8	10"	Left forward	
Choir	Choir	187	Viola Celeste	8	10"	Left forward	
Choir	Choir	310	Voix Celeste (2 ranks)	8	10"	Left forward	
Choir	Choir	171	Dulzquint	5 1/3	10"	Left forward	ext. Dulciana
Choir	Choir	175	Dolce	4	10"	Left forward	extended
Choir	Choir	180	Spindle Flute	4	10"	Left forward	
Choir	Choir	181	Flute Overte	4	10"	Left forward	
Choir	Choir	309	Fugara	4	10"	Left forward	
Choir	Choir	175	Dulzard Twelfth	2 2/3	10"	Left forward	ext. Dolce
Choir	Choir	176	Melodia Twelfth	2 2/3	10"	Left forward	ext. Melodia
Choir	Choir	182	Flageolet	2	10"	Left forward	
Choir	Choir	175	Dulcett Fifteenth	2	10"	Left forward	ext. Dolce
Choir	Choir	176	Melodia Fifteenth	2	10"	Left forward	ext. Melodia
Choir	Choir	175	Dulce Nineteenth	1 1/3	10"	Left forward	ext. Dolce
Choir	Choir	175	Dulcinett Twenty-Second	1	10"	Left forward	ext. Dolce
Choir	Choir	183	Flute Mixture 15–17	III	10"	Left forward	
Choir	Choir	196	Acuta 19–31	VI	10"	Left forward	
Choir	Choir	188	Contra Tomba	16	25"	Left forward	extended
Choir	Choir	189	Tromba Real	8	25"	Left forward	
Choir	Choir	190	Brass Cornet	8	25"	Left forward	
Choir	Choir	191	French Horn	8	10"	Left forward	
Choir	Choir	192	Clarinet	8	10"	Left forward	
Choir	Choir	193	Bassett Horn	8	10"	Left forward	
Choir	Choir	194	Cor Anglais	8	10"	Left forward	
Choir	Choir	195	Kinura	8	10"	Left forward	
Choir	Choir	188	Tromba Clarion	4	25"	Left forward	ext. Contra Tromba
Choir	Choir-swell	147	Gross Gedeckt	16	15"	Left stage	from Swell-Choir
Choir	Choir-swell	311	Stopped Diapason	16	10"	Left stage	from Swell-Choir
Choir	Choir-swell	148	Cone Gamba	16	15"	Left stage	from Swell-Choir
Choir	Choir-swell	152	Gemshorn	8	15"	Left stage	from Swell-Choir
Choir	Choir-swell	153	Gemshorn Celeste I	8	15"	Left stage	from Swell-Choir
Choir	Choir-swell	154	Gemshorn Celeste II	8	15"	Left stage	from Swell-Choir
Choir	Choir-swell	149	Clarabella	8	15"	Left stage	from Swell-Choir
Choir	Choir-swell	150	Doppel Spitz Flute	8	10"	Left stage	from Swell-Choir
Choir	Choir-swell	147	Doppel Gedeckt	8	15"	Left stage	from Swell-Choir
Choir	Choir-swell	311	Stopped Diapason	8	10"	Left stage	from Swell-Choir
Choir	Choir-swell	148	Cone Gamba	8	15"	Left stage	from Swell-Choir
Choir	Choir-swell	155	Third	6 2/5	10"	Left stage	from Swell-Choir
Choir	Choir-swell	156	Fifth	5 1/3	10"	Left stage	from Swell-Choir
Choir	Choir-swell	153	Gemshorn Quint	5 1/3	15"	Left stage	from Swell-Choir
Choir	Choir-swell	148	Gamba Quint	5 1/3	15"	Left stage	from Swell-Choir
Choir	Choir-swell	157	Seventh	4 4/7	10"	Left stage	from Swell-Choir
Choir	Choir-swell	152	Octave Gemshorn	4	15"	Left stage	from Swell-Choir
Choir	Choir-swell	149	Claribel Flute	4	15"	Left stage	from Swell-Choir
Choir	Choir-swell	150	Spitz Flute	4	10"	Left stage	from Swell-Choir
Choir	Choir-swell	147	Doppel Flute	4	15"	Left stage	from Swell-Choir
Choir	Choir-swell	311	Stopped Flute	4	10"	Left stage	from Swell-Choir
Choir	Choir-swell	151	Zauber Flute	4	15"	Left stage	from Swell-Choir
Choir	Choir-swell	148	Cone Flute	4	15"	Left stage	from Swell-Choir
Choir	Choir-swell	158	Ninth	3 5/9	10"	Left stage	from Swell-Choir
Choir	Choir-swell	155	Major Tenth	3 1/5	10"	Left stage	from Swell-Choir
Choir	Choir-swell	154	Gemshorn Tenth	3 1/5	15"	Left stage	from Swell-Choir
Choir	Choir-swell	159	Eleventh	3	10"	Left stage	from Swell-Choir
Choir	Choir-swell	153	Gemshorn Twelfth	2 2/3	15"	Left stage	from Swell-Choir
Choir	Choir-swell	156	Twelfth	2 2/3	10"	Left stage	from Swell-Choir
Choir	Choir-swell	149	Flute Twelfth	2 2/3	15"	Left stage	from Swell-Choir
Choir	Choir-swell	311	Stopped Flute Twelfth	2 2/3	10"	Left stage	from Swell-Choir
Choir	Choir-swell	157	Octave Septieme	2 2/7	10"	Left stage	from Swell-Choir
Choir	Choir-swell	152	Gemshorn Fifteenth	2	15"	Left stage	from Swell-Choir
Choir	Choir-swell	150	Flute Fifteenth	2	10"	Left stage	from Swell-Choir
Choir	Choir-swell	151	Magic Flute	2	15"	Left stage	from Swell-Choir
Choir	Choir-swell	158	Sixteenth	1 7/9	10"	Left stage	from Swell-Choir
Choir	Choir-swell	155	Major Seventeenth	1 3/5	10"	Left stage	from Swell-Choir
Choir	Choir-swell	154	Gemshorn Seventeenth	1 3/5	15"	Left stage	from Swell-Choir
Choir	Choir-swell	159	Eighteenth	1 1/2	10"	Left stage	from Swell-Choir
Choir	Choir-swell	156	Major Nineteenth	1 1/3	10"	Left stage	from Swell-Choir
Choir	Choir-swell	153	Gemshorn Nineteenth	1 1/3	15"	Left stage	from Swell-Choir
Choir	Choir-swell	157	Twenty-First	1 1/7	10"	Left stage	from Swell-Choir
Choir	Choir-swell	152	Twenty-Second	1	15"	Left stage	from Swell-Choir
Choir	Choir-swell	151	Zauber Twenty-Second	1	15"	Left stage	from Swell-Choir
Choir	Choir-swell	158	Twenty-Third	8/9	10"	Left stage	from Swell-Choir
Choir	Choir-swell	155	Twenty-Fourth	4/5	10"	Left stage	from Swell-Choir
Choir	Choir-swell	159	Twenty-Fifth	5/7	10"	Left stage	from Swell-Choir
Choir	Choir-swell	156	Twenty-Sixth	2/3	10"	Left stage	from Swell-Choir
Choir	Choir-swell	152	Twenty-Ninth	1/2	15"	Left stage	from Swell-Choir
Choir	Choir-swell	152	Thirty-Sixth	1/4	15"	Left stage	from Swell-Choir
Choir	Choir-swell	19	Fagotto	32	20"	Left stage	from Fagotto, Pedal Left
Choir	Choir-swell	160	Contra Oboe	16	15"	Left stage	from Swell-Choir
Choir	Choir-swell	161	Bass Clarinet	16	15"	Left stage	from Swell-Choir
Choir	Choir-swell	162	Bass Vox Humana	16	15"	Left stage	from Swell-Choir
Choir	Choir-swell	160	Oboe	8	15"	Left stage	from Swell-Choir
Choir	Choir-swell	161	Clarinet	8	15"	Left stage	from Swell-Choir
Choir	Choir-swell	162	Vox Humana	8	15"	Left stage	from Swell-Choir
Choir	Choir-swell	160	Octave Oboe	4	15"	Left stage	from Swell-Choir
Choir	Choir-swell	161	Octave Clarinet	4	15"	Left stage	from Swell-Choir
Choir	Choir-swell	162	Vox Humana	4	15"	Left stage	from Swell-Choir
Choir	Choir-swell	163	Marimba Harp Repeat	8		Left forward	from Swell-Choir
Choir	Choir-swell	163	Marimba Harp Stroke	8		Left forward	from Swell-Choir
Choir	Choir-swell	164	Glockenspiel Repeat	4		Left forward	from Swell-Choir
Choir	Choir-swell	164	Glockenspiel Single	4		Left forward	from Swell-Choir
Choir	Choir-swell	164	Glockenspiel Single	2		Left forward	from Swell-Choir
Choir	Grand choir	11	Diaphone	16	50"	Left stage	from Diaphone, Pedal Left
Choir	Grand choir	11	Diaphone Melody	16	50"	Left stage	from Diaphone, Pedal Left
Choir	Grand choir	11	Diaphone	8	50"	Left stage	from Diaphone, Pedal Left
Choir	Grand choir	12	Diapason	8	20"	Left stage	from Diapason, Pedal Left
Choir	Grand choir	13	Diaphonic Diapason	8	35"	Left stage	from Diaphonic Diapason, Pedal Left
Choir	Grand choir	15	Tibia Clausa	8	20"	Left stage	from Tibia Clausa, Pedal Left
Choir	Grand choir	14	Violoncello	8	20"	Left stage	from Bass Viol, Pedal Left
Choir	Grand choir	18	Bombard	16	50"	Left stage	from Bombard, Pedal Left
Choir	Grand choir	19	Fagotto	16	20"	Left stage	from Fagotto, Pedal Left
Choir	Grand choir	20	Major Posaune	8	50"	Left stage	from Major Posaune, Pedal Left
Choir	Grand choir	18	Bombard	8	50"	Left stage	from Bombard, Pedal Left
Choir	Grand choir	11	Bombard melody	4	50"	Left stage	from Bombard, Pedal Left
Choir	Grand choir	19	Chalumeau	8	20"	Left stage	from Fagotto, Pedal Left
Choir	Grand choir	19	Octave Oboe	4	20"	Left stage	from Fagotto, Pedal Left
Choir	Choir second touch	265	Double Bass	16	15"	Right forward	from Double Bass, String II
Choir	Choir second touch	266	Contra Bass	16	15"	Right forward	from Contra Bass, String II
Choir	Choir second touch	267	Contra Viol	16	15"	Right forward	from Contra Viol, String II
Choir	Choir second touch	265	Viola	8	15"	Right forward	from Double Bass, String II
Choir	Choir second touch	266	Violoncello	8	15"	Right forward	from Contra Bass, String II
Choir	Choir second touch	267	Violoncello	8	15"	Right forward	from Contra Viol, String II
Choir	Choir second touch	266	Violoncello	4	15"	Right forward	from Contra Bass, String II
Choir	Choir second touch	267	Violoncello	4	15"	Right forward	from Contra Viol, String II
Great	Great	21	Sub Principal	32	20"	Right stage	extended
Great	Great	22	Double Diapason I	16	20"	Right stage	extended
Great	Great	23	Double Diapason II	16	15"	Right stage	
Great	Great	24	Double Diapason III	16	10"	Right stage	
Great	Great	25	Sub Quint	10 2/3	15"	Right stage	
Great	Great	26	Diapason I	8	30"	Right stage	
Great	Great	27	Diapason II	8	30"	Right stage	
Great	Great	28	Diapason III	8	20"	Right stage	
Great	Great	21	Principal	8	20"	Right stage	ext. Sub Principal
Great	Great	29	Diapason IV	8	15"	Right stage	
Great	Great	30	Diapason V	8	15"	Right stage	
Great	Great	31	Diapason VI	8	15"	Right stage	
Great	Great	32	Diapason VII	8	10"	Right stage	
Great	Great	33	Diapason VIII	8	10"	Right stage	
Great	Great	34	Diapason IX	8	10"	Right stage	
Great	Great	35	Diapason X	8	4"	Right stage	
Great	Great	53	Harmonic Flute	8	15"	Right stage	
Great	Great	54	Flute Overte	8	4"	Right stage	
Great	Great	36	Quint	5 1/3	20"	Right stage	
Great	Great	37	Octave I	4	20"	Right stage	
Great	Great	38	Octave II	4	20"	Right stage	
Great	Great	22	Octave Diapason	4	20"	Right stage	ext. Double Diapason I
Great	Great	39	Octave III	4	15"	Right stage	
Great	Great	40	Octave IV	4	10"	Right stage	
Great	Great	41	Octave V	4	10"	Right stage	
Great	Great	55	Harmonic Flute	4	15"	Right stage	
Great	Great	42	Gross Tierce	3 1/5	20"	Right stage	
Great	Great	43	Major Twelfth	2 2/3	20"	Right stage	
Great	Great	44	Fifteenth I	2	20"	Right stage	
Great	Great	21	Super Principal	2	20"	Right stage	ext. Sub Principal
Great	Great	45	Fifteenth II	2	15"	Right stage	
Great	Great	46	Fifteenth III	2	10"	Right stage	
Great	Great	47	Rausch Quint 5–8	II	30"	Right stage	
Great	Great	48	Rausch Quint 12–15	II	30"	Right stage	
Great	Great	49	Grand Cornet 05–22	XI	20"	Right stage	
Great	Great	50	Major Sesquialtera 10–22	V	20"	Right stage	
Great	Great	51	Schulze Mixture 12–26	V	4"	Right stage	
Great	Great	52	Furniture 17–36	VI	15"	Right stage	
Great	Great	49	Scharf Mixture 17–22	III	20"	Right stage	from Grand Cornet
Great	Great	51	Doublette Mixture 22–26	II	4"	Right stage	from Schulze Mixture
Great	Great	56	Trumpet	16	30"	Right stage	
Great	Great	57	Harmonic Trumpet	8	30"	Right stage	
Great	Great	58	Harmonic Clarion	4	30"	Right stage	
Great	Great-solo	82	Geigen Principal	16	15"	Right stage	ext. Geigen Principal
Great	Great-solo	81	Wald Flute	16	15"	Right stage	ext. Wald Flute
Great	Great-solo	83	Tibia Clausa	16	15"	Right stage	ext. Tibia Clausa
Great	Great-solo	81	Wald Quint	10 2/3	15"	Right stage	ext. Wald Flute
Great	Great-solo	83	Tibia Quint	10 2/3	15"	Right stage	ext. Tibia Clausa
Great	Great-solo	84	Diapason Phonon	8	15"	Right stage	extended
Great	Great-solo	85	Horn Diapason	8	15"	Right stage	extended
Great	Great-solo	82	Geigen Principal	8	15"	Right stage	extended
Great	Great-solo	87	Gemshorn	8	15"	Right stage	extended
Great	Great-solo	88	Gemshorn Celeste	8	15"	Right stage	extended
Great	Great-solo	81	Wald Flute	8	15"	Right stage	extended
Great	Great-solo	86	Doppel Gedeckt	8	15"	Right stage	extended
Great	Great-solo	83	Tibia Clausa	8	15"	Right stage	extended
Great	Great-solo	89	Viola d'Gamba	8	15"	Right stage	extended
Great	Great-solo	90	Vox Celeste	8	15"	Right stage	extended
Great	Great-solo	91	Gemshorn Terz	6 2/5	15"	Right stage	extended
Great	Great-solo	92	Gemshorn Quint	5 1/3	15"	Right stage	extended
Great	Great-solo	81	Wald Quint	5 1/3	15"	Right stage	ext. Wald Flute
Great	Great-solo	93	Gemshorn Septieme	4 4/7	15"	Right stage	extended
Great	Great-solo	84	Octave Phonon	4	15"	Right stage	ext. Diapason Phonon
Great	Great-solo	85	Octave	4	15"	Right stage	ext. Horn Diapason
Great	Great-solo	82	Geigen Principal	4	15"	Right stage	ext. Geigen Principal
Great	Great-solo	87	Gemshorn	4	15"	Right stage	ext. Gemshorn
Great	Great-solo	88	Gemshorn Celeste	4	15"	Right stage	ext. Gemshorn Celeste
Great	Great-solo	81	Wald Flute	4	15"	Right stage	ext. Wald Flute
Great	Great-solo	86	Doppel Gedeckt	4	15"	Right stage	ext. Doppel Gedeckt
Great	Great-solo	83	Tibia Clausa	4	15"	Right stage	ext. Tibia Clausa
Great	Great-solo	89	Viola d'Gamba	4	15"	Right stage	ext. Viola d'Gamba
Great	Great-solo	90	Vox Celeste	4	15"	Right stage	ext. Vox Celeste
Great	Great-solo	88	Gemshorn Tenth	3 1/5	15"	Right stage	ext. Gemshorn Celeste
Great	Great-solo	91	Tenth	3 1/5	15"	Right stage	ext. Gemshorn Terz
Great	Great-solo	92	Twelfth	2 2/3	15"	Right stage	ext. Gemshorn Quint
Great	Great-solo	81	Flute Twelfth	2 2/3	15"	Right stage	ext. Wald Flute
Great	Great-solo	83	Minor Twelfth	2 2/3	15"	Right stage	ext. Tibia Clausa
Great	Great-solo	93	Octave Septieme	2 2/7	15"	Right stage	ext. Gemshorn Septieme
Great	Great-solo	85	Fifteenth	2	15"	Right stage	ext. Horn Diapason
Great	Great-solo	82	Geigen Fifteenth	2	15"	Right stage	ext. Geigen Principal
Great	Great-solo	87	Gemshorn Fifteenth	2	15"	Right stage	ext. Gemshorn
Great	Great-solo	81	Piccolo	2	15"	Right stage	ext. Wald Flute
Great	Great-solo	88	Gemshorn Seventeenth	1 3/5	15"	Right stage	ext. Gemshorn Celeste
Great	Great-solo	91	Seventeenth	1 3/5	15"	Right stage	ext. Gemshorn Terz
Great	Great-solo	92	Nineteenth	1 1/3	15"	Right stage	ext. Gemshorn Quint
Great	Great-solo	93	Twenty-First	1 1/7	15"	Right stage	ext. Gemshorn Septieme
Great	Great-solo	87	Gemshorn	1	15"	Right stage	ext. Gemshorn
Great	Great-solo	91	Twenty-Fourth	4/5	15"	Right stage	ext. Gemshorn Terz
Great	Great-solo	92	Twenty-Sixth	2/3	15"	Right stage	ext. Gemshorn Quint
Great	Great-solo	87	Twenty-Ninth	1/2	15"	Right stage	ext. Gemshorn
Great	Great-solo	87	Thirty-Sixth	1/4	15"	Right stage	ext. Gemshorn
Great	Great-solo	96	Saxophone	16	15"	Right stage	ext. Saxophone
Great	Great-solo	98	French Horn	16	15"	Right stage	ext. French Horn
Great	Great-solo	97	English Horn	16	15"	Right stage	ext. English Horn
Great	Great-solo	95	Oboe Horn	16	15"	Right stage	ext. Oboe Horn
Great	Great-solo	100	Krummhorn	16	15"	Right stage	ext. Krummhorn
Great	Great-solo	99	Vox Baryton	16	15"	Right stage	extended
Great	Great-solo	102	Orchestral Saxophone	8	15"	Right stage	
Great	Great-solo	96	Saxophone	8	15"	Right stage	extended
Great	Great-solo	101	Clarinet	8	15"	Right stage	
Great	Great-solo	98	French Horn	8	15"	Right stage	extended
Great	Great-solo	97	English Horn	8	15"	Right stage	extended
Great	Great-solo	95	Oboe Horn	8	15"	Right stage	extended
Great	Great-solo	103	Orchestral Oboe	8	15"	Right stage	
Great	Great-solo	100	Krummhorn	8	15"	Right stage	extended
Great	Great-solo	105	Vox Humana	8	15"	Right stage	extended
Great	Great-solo	99	Vox Humana	8	15"	Right stage	ext. Vox Baryton
Great	Great-solo	106	Kinura	8	15"	Right stage	
Great	Great-solo	96	Saxophone	4	15"	Right stage	ext. Saxophone
Great	Great-solo	98	French Horn	4	15"	Right stage	ext. French Horn
Great	Great-solo	97	English Horn	4	15"	Right stage	ext. English Horn
Great	Great-solo	95	Octave Horn	4	15"	Right stage	ext. Oboe Horn
Great	Great-solo	100	Krummhorn	4	15"	Right stage	ext. Krummhorn
Great	Great-solo	105	Vox Humana	4	15"	Right stage	ext. Vox Humana
Great	Great-solo	64	Flute Twelfth	2 2/3	15"	Right stage	
Great	Great-solo	108	Chimes	8		Left forward	
Great	Great-solo	107	Harp	8		Left forward	from Harp
Great	Great-solo	107	Harp	4		Left forward	from Harp
Great	Great-solo	94	Xylophone	4		Left forward	from Xylophone
Great	Great-solo	94	Xylophone	2		Left forward	from Xylophone
Great	Grand great	4	Principal	8	30"	Right stage	from Principal, Pedal Right
Great	Grand great	3	Tibia Major	8	30"	Right stage	from Tibia Major, Pedal Right
Great	Grand great	3	Tibia Melody	4	30"	Right stage	from Tibia Major, Pedal Right
Great	Grand great	1	Tibia Clausa	8	20"	Right stage	from Tibia Clausa, Pedal Right
Great	Grand great	5	Viol	8	30"	Right stage	from Viol, Pedal Right
Great	Grand great	5	Viol Melody	4	30"	Right stage	from Viol, Pedal Right
Great	Grand great	21	Octave	4	20"	Right stage	from Sub Principal, Great
Great	Grand great	4	Super Octave	2	30"	Right stage	from Principal, Pedal Right
Great	Grand great	17	Dulzian	32	35"	Right stage	from Dulzian, Pedal Right
Great	Grand great	8	Trombone	16	35"	Right stage	from Bombardon, Pedal Right
Great	Grand great	8	Trombone Melody	8	35"	Right stage	from Bombardon, Pedal Right
Great	Grand great	9	Ophicleide	8	100"	Right stage	from Grand Ophicleide, Pedal Right
Great	Grand great	10	Trumpet	8	20"	Right stage	from Trumpet, Pedal Right
Great	Grand great	10	Clarion	4	20"	Right stage	from Trumpet, Pedal Right
Great	Grand great	10	Clarion Melody	4	20"	Right stage	from Trumpet, Pedal Right
Great	Great second touch	254	Viol Phonon	8	25"	Left stage	from Contra Basso, String I
Great	Great second touch	265	Violoncello	8	15"	Right forward	from Double Bass, String II
Great	Great second touch	266	Viol	8	15"	Right forward	from Contra Bass, String II
Great	Great second touch	267	Viol	8	15"	Right forward	from Contra Viol, String II
Great	Great second touch	108	Chimes	8		Left forward	from Great-Solo
Swell	Swell	117	Double Diapason	16	15"	Left stage	extended
Swell	Swell	131	Contra Gamba	16	15"	Left stage	extended
Swell	Swell	118	Diapason I	8	15"	Left stage	
Swell	Swell	119	Diapason II	8	15"	Left stage	
Swell	Swell	120	Waldhorn	8	15"	Left stage	
Swell	Swell	124	Tibia Plena	8	15"	Left stage	
Swell	Swell	125	Hohl Flute	8	15"	Left stage	
Swell	Swell	127	Harmonic Flute	8	15"	Left stage	
Swell	Swell	312	Harmonic Flute Celeste	8	15"	Left stage	
Swell	Swell	126	Gross Gedeckt	8	15"	Left stage	
Swell	Swell	135	Gamba	8	15"	Left stage	
Swell	Swell	136	Gamba Celeste	8	15"	Left stage	
Swell	Swell	132	Violin	8	15"	Left stage	
Swell	Swell	133	Viol Celestes I (2 ranks)	8	15"	Left stage	
Swell	Swell	134	Viol Celestes II (2 ranks)	8	15"	Left stage	
Swell	Swell	121	Octave I	4	15"	Left stage	
Swell	Swell	128	Ocarina	4	15"	Left stage	
Swell	Swell	117	Octave II	4	15"	Left stage	ext. Double Diapason
Swell	Swell	129	Traverse Flute	4	15"	Left stage	
Swell	Swell	313	Silver Flute	4	15"	Left stage	
Swell	Swell	137	Gambette	4	15"	Left stage	
Swell	Swell	131	Salicet	4	15"	Left stage	ext. Contra Gamba
Swell	Swell	122	Fifteenth	2	15"	Left stage	
Swell	Swell	130	Orchestral Piccolo	2	15"	Left stage	
Swell	Swell	317	Cymbal 12–26	VIII	15"	Left stage	
Swell	Swell	123	Furniture 15–29	V	15"	Left stage	
Swell	Swell	146	Plein Jeu 15–36	VII	15"	Left stage	
Swell	Swell	138	Double Trumpet	16	30"	Left stage	extended
Swell	Swell	142	Double Horn	16	15"	Left stage	extended
Swell	Swell	139	Harmonic Trumpet	8	30"	Left stage	
Swell	Swell	140	Field Trumpet	8	30"	Left stage	
Swell	Swell	143	Posaune	8	15"	Left stage	
Swell	Swell	144	Cornopean	8	15"	Left stage	
Swell	Swell	314	Muted Trumpet	8	15"	Left stage	
Swell	Swell	145	Flugel Horn	8	15"	Left stage	
Swell	Swell	315	Krummhorn	8	15"	Left stage	
Swell	Swell	316	Vox Humana	8	15"	Left stage	
Swell	Swell	141	Trumpet Clarion	4	30"	Left stage	
Swell	Swell	138	Trumpet Clarion	4	30"	Left stage	ext. Double Trumpet
Swell	Swell	142	Octave Horn	4	15"	Left stage	ext. Double Horn
Swell	Swell-choir	147	Gross Gedeckt	16	15"	Left stage	ext. Gross Gedeckt
Swell	Swell-choir	311	Stopped Diapason	16	10"	Left stage	ext. Stopped Diapason
Swell	Swell-choir	148	Cone Gamba	16	15"	Left stage	ext. Cone Gamba
Swell	Swell-choir	152	Gemshorn	8	15"	Left stage	extended
Swell	Swell-choir	153	Gemshorn Celeste I	8	15"	Left stage	extended
Swell	Swell-choir	154	Gemshorn Celeste II	8	15"	Left stage	extended
Swell	Swell-choir	149	Clarabella	8	15"	Left stage	extended
Swell	Swell-choir	150	Doppel Spitz Flute	8	10"	Left stage	extended
Swell	Swell-choir	147	Doppel Gedeckt	8	15"	Left stage	extended
Swell	Swell-choir	311	Stopped Diapason	8	10"	Left stage	extended
Swell	Swell-choir	148	Cone Gamba	8	15"	Left stage	extended
Swell	Swell-choir	155	Third	6 2/5	10"	Left stage	extended
Swell	Swell-choir	156	Fifth	5 1/3	10"	Left stage	extended
Swell	Swell-choir	153	Gemshorn Quint	5 1/3	15"	Left stage	ext. Gemshorn Celeste I
Swell	Swell-choir	148	Gamba Quint	5 1/3	15"	Left stage	ext. Cone Gamba
Swell	Swell-choir	157	Seventh	4 4/7	10"	Left stage	extended
Swell	Swell-choir	152	Octave Gemshorn	4	15"	Left stage	ext. Gemshorn
Swell	Swell-choir	149	Claribel Flute	4	15"	Left stage	ext. Clarabella
Swell	Swell-choir	150	Spitz Flute	4	10"	Left stage	ext. Doppel Spitz Flute
Swell	Swell-choir	147	Doppel Flute	4	15"	Left stage	ext. Doppel Gedeckt
Swell	Swell-choir	311	Stopped Flute	4	10"	Left stage	ext. Stopped Diapason
Swell	Swell-choir	151	Zauber Flute	4	15"	Left stage	extended
Swell	Swell-choir	148	Cone Flute	4	15"	Left stage	ext. Cone Gamba
Swell	Swell-choir	158	Ninth	3 5/9	10"	Left stage	extended
Swell	Swell-choir	155	Major Tenth	3 1/5	10"	Left stage	ext. Third
Swell	Swell-choir	154	Gemshorn Tenth	3 1/5	15"	Left stage	ext. Gemshorn Celeste II
Swell	Swell-choir	159	Eleventh	3	10"	Left stage	extended
Swell	Swell-choir	153	Gemshorn Twelfth	2 2/3	15"	Left stage	ext. Gemshorn Celeste I
Swell	Swell-choir	156	Twelfth	2 2/3	10"	Left stage	ext. Fifth
Swell	Swell-choir	149	Flute Twelfth	2 2/3	15"	Left stage	ext. Clarabella
Swell	Swell-choir	311	Stopped Flute Twelfth	2 2/3	10"	Left stage	ext. Stopped Diapason
Swell	Swell-choir	157	Octave Septieme	2 2/7	10"	Left stage	ext. Seventh
Swell	Swell-choir	152	Gemshorn Fifteenth	2	15"	Left stage	ext. Gemshorn
Swell	Swell-choir	147	Gedeckt Fifteenth	2	15"	Left stage	ext. Doppel Gedeckt
Swell	Swell-choir	151	Magic Flute	2	15"	Left stage	ext. Zauber Flute
Swell	Swell-choir	158	Sixteenth	1 7/9	10"	Left stage	ext. Ninth
Swell	Swell-choir	155	Major Seventeenth	1 3/5	10"	Left stage	ext. Third
Swell	Swell-choir	154	Gemshorn Seventeenth	1 3/5	15"	Left stage	ext. Gemshorn Celeste II
Swell	Swell-choir	159	Eighteenth	1 1/2	10"	Left stage	ext. Eleventh
Swell	Swell-choir	156	Major Nineteenth	1 1/3	10"	Left stage	ext. Fifth
Swell	Swell-choir	153	Gemshorn Nineteenth	1 1/3	15"	Left stage	ext. Gemshorn Celeste I
Swell	Swell-choir	157	Twenty-First	1 1/7	10"	Left stage	ext. Seventh
Swell	Swell-choir	152	Twenty-Second	1	15"	Left stage	ext. Gemshorn
Swell	Swell-choir	151	Zauber Twenty-Second	1	15"	Left stage	ext. Zauber Flute
Swell	Swell-choir	158	Twenty-Third	8/9	10"	Left stage	ext. Ninth
Swell	Swell-choir	155	Twenty-Fourth	4/5	10"	Left stage	ext. Third
Swell	Swell-choir	159	Twenty-Fifth	5/7	10"	Left stage	ext. Eleventh
Swell	Swell-choir	156	Twenty-Sixth	2/3	10"	Left stage	ext. Fifth
Swell	Swell-choir	152	Twenty-Ninth	1/2	15"	Left stage	ext. Gemshorn
Swell	Swell-choir	156	Thirty-Third	1/3	10"	Left stage	ext. Fifth
Swell	Swell-choir	152	Thirty-Sixth	1/4	15"	Left stage	ext. Gemshorn
Swell	Swell-choir	19	Fagotto	32	20"	Left stage	from Fagotto, Pedal Left
Swell	Swell-choir	160	Contra Oboe	16	15"	Left stage	ext. Oboe
Swell	Swell-choir	161	Bass Clarinet	16	15"	Left stage	ext. Clarinet
Swell	Swell-choir	162	Bass Vox Humana	16	15"	Left stage	ext. Vox Humana
Swell	Swell-choir	160	Oboe	8	15"	Left stage	extended
Swell	Swell-choir	161	Clarinet	8	15"	Left stage	extended
Swell	Swell-choir	162	Vox Humana	8	15"	Left stage	extended
Swell	Swell-choir	160	Octave Oboe	4	15"	Left stage	ext. Oboe
Swell	Swell-choir	161	Octave Clarinet	4	15"	Left stage	ext. Clarinet
Swell	Swell-choir	162	Vox Humana	4	15"	Left stage	ext. Vox Humana
Swell	Swell-choir	163	Marimba Harp Repeat	8		Left forward	from Marimba Harp
Swell	Swell-choir	163	Marimba Harp Stroke	8		Left forward	from Marimba Harp
Swell	Swell-choir	163	Marimba Harp Repeat	4		Left forward	from Marimba Harp
Swell	Swell-choir	163	Marimba Harp Stroke	4		Left forward	from Marimba Harp
Swell	Swell-choir	164	Glockenspiel Repeat	4		Left forward	from Glockenspiel
Swell	Swell-choir	164	Glockenspiel Single	4		Left forward	from Glockenspiel
Swell	Swell-choir	164	Glockenspiel Single	2		Left forward	from Glockenspiel
Solo	Solo	59	Major Flute	16	30"	Right stage	ext. Major Flute
Solo	Solo	59	Flute Quint	10 2/3	30"	Right stage	ext. Major Flute
Solo	Solo	71	Stentor Diapason	8	30"	Right stage	
Solo	Solo	79	Diapason	8	30"	Right stage	8' rank from Grand Chorus
Solo	Solo	60	Tibia Rex	8	30"	Right stage	
Solo	Solo	59	Major Flute	8	30"	Right stage	extended
Solo	Solo	61	Hohl Flute	8	20"	Right stage	
Solo	Solo	62	Flute Overte	8	20"	Right stage	
Solo	Solo	66	Cello Pomposa	8	20"	Right stage	
Solo	Solo	67	Cello Celeste	8	20"	Right stage	
Solo	Solo	68	Violin	8	20"	Right stage	
Solo	Solo	69	Violin Celeste	8	20"	Right stage	
Solo	Solo	59	Flute Quint	5 1/3	30"	Right stage	ext. Major Flute
Solo	Solo	72	Stentor Octave	4	30"	Right stage	
Solo	Solo	79	Octave	4	30"	Right stage	4' rank from Grand Chorus
Solo	Solo	59	Major Flute	4	30"	Right stage	ext. Major Flute
Solo	Solo	63	Wald Flute	4	30"	Right stage	
Solo	Solo	70	Viola Pomposa	4	20"	Right stage	
Solo	Solo	65	Harmonic Piccolo	2	20"	Right stage	
Solo	Solo	79	Grand Chorus 1–29	IX	30"	Right stage	
Solo	Solo	80	Carillon 17–24	IV	30"	Right stage	
Solo	Solo	73	Tuba Magna	16	50"	Right stage	ext. Tuba Magna
Solo	Solo	74	Trumpet Profunda	16	30"	Right stage	ext. Trumpet Profunda
Solo	Solo	74	Trumpet Quint	10 2/3	30"	Right stage	ext. Trumpet Profunda
Solo	Solo	75	Tuba Imperial	8	100"	Right stage	
Solo	Solo	73	Tuba Magna	8	50"	Right stage	extended
Solo	Solo	78	Bugle	8	50"	Right stage	
Solo	Solo	76	Trumpet Royal	8	30"	Right stage	
Solo	Solo	74	Trumpet Profunda	8	30"	Right stage	extended
Solo	Solo	77	English Horn	8	30"	Right stage	
Solo	Solo	104	French Horn	8	30"	Right stage	
Solo	Solo	73	Magna Fifth	5 1/3	50"	Right stage	ext. Tuba Magna
Solo	Solo	73	Tuba Clarion	4	50"	Right stage	ext. Tuba Magna
Solo	Solo	74	Trumpet Clarion	4	30"	Right stage	ext. Trumpet Profunda
Solo	Solo-great	82	Geigen Principal	16	15"	Right stage	from Great-Solo
Solo	Solo-great	81	Wald Flute	16	15"	Right stage	from Great-Solo
Solo	Solo-great	83	Tibia Clausa	16	15"	Right stage	from Great-Solo
Solo	Solo-great	81	Wald Quint	10 2/3	15"	Right stage	from Great-Solo
Solo	Solo-great	83	Tibia Quint	10 2/3	15"	Right stage	from Great-Solo
Solo	Solo-great	84	Diapason Phonon	8	15"	Right stage	from Great-Solo
Solo	Solo-great	85	Horn Diapason	8	15"	Right stage	from Great-Solo
Solo	Solo-great	82	Geigen Principal	8	15"	Right stage	from Great-Solo
Solo	Solo-great	87	Gemshorn	8	15"	Right stage	from Great-Solo
Solo	Solo-great	88	Gemshorn Celeste	8	15"	Right stage	from Great-Solo
Solo	Solo-great	81	Wald Flute	8	15"	Right stage	from Great-Solo
Solo	Solo-great	86	Doppel Gedeckt	8	15"	Right stage	from Great-Solo
Solo	Solo-great	83	Tibia Clausa	8	15"	Right stage	from Great-Solo
Solo	Solo-great	89	Viola d'Gamba	8	15"	Right stage	from Great-Solo
Solo	Solo-great	90	Vox Celeste	8	15"	Right stage	from Great-Solo
Solo	Solo-great	91	Gemshorn Terz	6 2/5	15"	Right stage	from Great-Solo
Solo	Solo-great	92	Gemshorn Quint	5 1/3	15"	Right stage	from Great-Solo
Solo	Solo-great	81	Wald Quint	5 1/3	15"	Right stage	from Great-Solo
Solo	Solo-great	93	Gemshorn Septieme	4 4/7	15"	Right stage	from Great-Solo
Solo	Solo-great	84	Octave Phonon	4	15"	Right stage	from Great-Solo
Solo	Solo-great	85	Octave	4	15"	Right stage	from Great-Solo
Solo	Solo-great	82	Geigen Principal	4	15"	Right stage	from Great-Solo
Solo	Solo-great	87	Gemshorn	4	15"	Right stage	from Great-Solo
Solo	Solo-great	88	Gemshorn Celeste	4	15"	Right stage	from Great-Solo
Solo	Solo-great	81	Wald Flute	4	15"	Right stage	from Great-Solo
Solo	Solo-great	86	Doppel Gedeckt	4	15"	Right stage	from Great-Solo
Solo	Solo-great	83	Tibia Clausa	4	15"	Right stage	from Great-Solo
Solo	Solo-great	89	Viola d'Gamba	4	15"	Right stage	from Great-Solo
Solo	Solo-great	90	Vox Celeste	4	15"	Right stage	from Great-Solo
Solo	Solo-great	88	Gemshorn Tenth	1 3/5	15"	Right stage	from Great-Solo
Solo	Solo-great	91	Tenth	1 3/5	15"	Right stage	from Great-Solo
Solo	Solo-great	92	Twelfth	1 1/3	15"	Right stage	from Great-Solo
Solo	Solo-great	81	Flute Twelfth	1 1/3	15"	Right stage	from Great-Solo
Solo	Solo-great	83	Minor Twelfth	1 1/3	15"	Right stage	from Great-Solo
Solo	Solo-great	93	Octave Septieme	1 1/7	15"	Right stage	from Great-Solo
Solo	Solo-great	85	Fifteenth	2	15"	Right stage	from Great-Solo
Solo	Solo-great	82	Geigen Fifteenth	2	15"	Right stage	from Great-Solo
Solo	Solo-great	87	Gemshorn Fifteenth	2	15"	Right stage	from Great-Solo
Solo	Solo-great	81	Piccolo	2	15"	Right stage	from Great-Solo
Solo	Solo-great	88	Gemshorn Seventeenth	1 3/5	15"	Right stage	from Great-Solo
Solo	Solo-great	91	Seventeenth	1 3/5	15"	Right stage	from Great-Solo
Solo	Solo-great	92	Nineteenth	1 1/3	15"	Right stage	from Great-Solo
Solo	Solo-great	93	Twenty-First	1 1/7	15"	Right stage	from Great-Solo
Solo	Solo-great	87	Gemshorn	1	15"	Right stage	from Great-Solo
Solo	Solo-great	91	Twenty-Fourth	4/5	15"	Right stage	from Great-Solo
Solo	Solo-great	92	Twenty-Sixth	2/3	15"	Right stage	from Great-Solo
Solo	Solo-great	87	Twenty-Ninth	1/2	15"	Right stage	from Great-Solo
Solo	Solo-great	87	Thirty-Sixth	1/4	15"	Right stage	from Great-Solo
Solo	Solo-great	96	Saxophone	16	15"	Right stage	from Great-Solo
Solo	Solo-great	98	French Horn	16	15"	Right stage	from Great-Solo
Solo	Solo-great	97	English Horn	16	15"	Right stage	from Great-Solo
Solo	Solo-great	95	Oboe Horn	16	15"	Right stage	from Great-Solo
Solo	Solo-great	100	Krummhorn	16	15"	Right stage	from Great-Solo
Solo	Solo-great	99	Vox Baryton	16	15"	Right stage	from Great-Solo
Solo	Solo-great	102	Orchestral Saxophone	8	15"	Right stage	from Great-Solo
Solo	Solo-great	96	Saxophone	8	15"	Right stage	from Great-Solo
Solo	Solo-great	101	Clarinet	8	15"	Right stage	from Great-Solo
Solo	Solo-great	98	French Horn	8	15"	Right stage	from Great-Solo
Solo	Solo-great	97	English Horn	8	15"	Right stage	from Great-Solo
Solo	Solo-great	95	Oboe Horn	8	15"	Right stage	from Great-Solo
Solo	Solo-great	103	Orchestral Oboe	8	15"	Right stage	from Great-Solo
Solo	Solo-great	100	Krummhorn	8	15"	Right stage	from Great-Solo
Solo	Solo-great	105	Vox Humana	8	15"	Right stage	from Great-Solo
Solo	Solo-great	99	Vox Humana	8	15"	Right stage	from Great-Solo
Solo	Solo-great	106	Kinura	8	15"	Right stage	from Great-Solo
Solo	Solo-great	96	Saxophone	4	15"	Right stage	from Great-Solo
Solo	Solo-great	98	French Horn	4	15"	Right stage	from Great-Solo
Solo	Solo-great	97	English Horn	4	15"	Right stage	from Great-Solo
Solo	Solo-great	95	Octave Horn	4	15"	Right stage	from Great-Solo
Solo	Solo-great	100	Krummhorn	4	15"	Right stage	from Great-Solo
Solo	Solo-great	105	Vox Humana	4	15"	Right stage	from Great-Solo
Solo	Solo-great	64	Flute Twelfth	2 2/3	15"	Right stage	from Great-Solo
Solo	Solo-great	108	Chimes	8		Left forward	from Great-Solo
Solo	Solo-great	107	Harp	8		Left forward	from Great-Solo
Solo	Solo-great	107	Harp	4		Left forward	from Great-Solo
Solo	Solo-great	94	Xylophone	4		Left forward	from Great-Solo
Solo	Solo-great	94	Xylophone	2		Left forward	from Great-Solo
Fanfare	Fanfare	197	Major Flute	16	20"	Left upper	extended
Fanfare	Fanfare	212	Stentor Diapason	8	35"	Left upper	8' rank from Stentor Mixture
Fanfare	Fanfare	199	Stentorphone	8	20"	Left upper	
Fanfare	Fanfare	198	Stentor Flute	8	35"	Left upper	
Fanfare	Fanfare	200	Pileata Magna	8	20"	Left upper	
Fanfare	Fanfare	304	Gamba Tuba	8	20"	Left upper	
Fanfare	Fanfare	305	Gamba Tuba Celeste	8	20"	Left upper	
Fanfare	Fanfare	212	Stentor Octave	4	35"	Left upper	4' rank from Stentor Mixture
Fanfare	Fanfare	197	Major Flute	4	20"	Left upper	ext. Major Flute
Fanfare	Fanfare	201	Flute Octaviante	4	20"	Left upper	
Fanfare	Fanfare	306	Gamba Clarion	4	20"	Left upper	
Fanfare	Fanfare	203	Recorder	2 2/3	20"	Left upper	
Fanfare	Fanfare	202	Fife	2	20"	Left upper	
Fanfare	Fanfare	212	Stentor Mixture 1–22	VII	35"	Left upper	
Fanfare	Fanfare	307	Harmonic Mixture 17–29	VI	20"	Left upper	
Fanfare	Fanfare	204	Cymbale 19–33	V	20"	Left upper	
Fanfare	Fanfare	205	Contra Posaune	16	50"	Left upper	ext. Posaune
Fanfare	Fanfare	206	Contra Bombardon	16	35"	Left upper	ext. Bombardon
Fanfare	Fanfare	299	Contra Trombone	16	35"	Left upper	ext. Trombone
Fanfare	Fanfare	209	Tromba Quint	10 2/3	20"	Left upper	extended
Fanfare	Fanfare	207	Harmonic Tuba	8	50"	Left upper	extended
Fanfare	Fanfare	207	Tuba Melody	4	50"	Left upper	from Harmonic Tuba
Fanfare	Fanfare	208	Ophicleide	8	50"	Left upper	
Fanfare	Fanfare	205	Posaune	8	50"	Left upper	extended
Fanfare	Fanfare	206	Bombardon	8	35"	Left upper	extended
Fanfare	Fanfare	299	Trombone	8	35"	Left upper	extended
Fanfare	Fanfare	209	Tromba	8	20"	Left upper	ext. Tromba Quint
Fanfare	Fanfare	210	Tromba Tierce	6 2/5	20"	Left upper	
Fanfare	Fanfare	299	Trombone Fifth	5 1/3	35"	Left upper	ext. Trombone
Fanfare	Fanfare	209	Tromba Fifth	5 1/3	20"	Left upper	ext. Tromba Quint
Fanfare	Fanfare	211	Major Clarion	4	50"	Left upper	
Fanfare	Fanfare	207	Harmonic Clarion	4	50"	Left upper	ext. Harmonic Tuba
Fanfare	Fanfare	205	Octave Posaune	4	50"	Left upper	ext. Posaune
Fanfare	Fanfare	206	Bombardon	4	35"	Left upper	ext. Bombardon
Fanfare	Fanfare	299	Trombone Clarion	4	35"	Left upper	ext. Trombone
Fanfare	Fanfare	210	Tromba Tierce	3 1/5	20"	Left upper	ext. Tromba Tierce
Fanfare	Fanfare	209	Tromba Twelfth	2 2/3	20"	Left upper	ext. Tromba Quint
Fanfare	Fanfare	206	Bombardon	2	35"	Left upper	ext. Bombardon
Echo	Echo	214	Spire Flute	16	15"	Right upper	ext. Spire Flute
Echo	Echo	298	Contra Violone	16	25"	Right upper	ext. Violone
Echo	Echo	213	Contra Gamba	16	15"	Right upper	ext. Gamba
Echo	Echo	215	Diapason	8	15"	Right upper	
Echo	Echo	219	Waldhorn	8	15"	Right upper	
Echo	Echo	220	Clarabella	8	15"	Right upper	extended
Echo	Echo	214	Spire Flute	8	15"	Right upper	extended
Echo	Echo	216	Spitz Flute	8	15"	Right upper	
Echo	Echo	217	Spitz Flute Celeste I	8	15"	Right upper	
Echo	Echo	218	Spitz Flute Celeste II	8	15"	Right upper	extended
Echo	Echo	222	Flute Sylvestre	8	15"	Right upper	
Echo	Echo	223	Flute Celeste	8	15"	Right upper	
Echo	Echo	221	Tibia Mollis	8	15"	Right upper	
Echo	Echo	298	Violone	8	25"	Right upper	extended
Echo	Echo	319	Violone Celeste	8	25"	Right upper	
Echo	Echo	213	Gamba	8	15"	Right upper	extended
Echo	Echo	220	Open Flute	4	15"	Right upper	ext. Clarabella
Echo	Echo	214	Spire Flute	4	15"	Right upper	ext. Spire Flute
Echo	Echo	298	Violone	4	25"	Right upper	ext. Violone
Echo	Echo	213	Gamba	4	15"	Right upper	ext. Gamba
Echo	Echo	224	Rohr Flute	4	15"	Right upper	
Echo	Echo	218	Spitz Tenth	3 1/5	15"	Right upper	ext. Spitz Flute Celeste II
Echo	Echo	220	Open Flute	2 2/3	15"	Right upper	ext. Clarabella
Echo	Echo	214	Spire Flute	2 2/3	15"	Right upper	ext. Spire Flute
Echo	Echo	220	Flute Fifteenth	2	15"	Right upper	ext. Clarabella
Echo	Echo	214	Spire Flute	2	15"	Right upper	ext. Spire Flute
Echo	Echo	218	Spitz Seventeenth	1 3/5	15"	Right upper	ext. Spitz Flute Celeste II
Echo	Echo	214	Spire Flute	1 1/3	15"	Right upper	ext. Spire Flute
Echo	Echo	214	Spire Flute	1	15"	Right upper	ext. Spire Flute
Echo	Echo	225	Mixture Aetheria 15–29	VI	15"	Right upper	
Echo	Echo	231	Tuba d'Amour	16	25"	Right upper	ext. Tuba d'Amour
Echo	Echo	226	Contra Bassoon	16	15"	Right upper	ext. Bassoon
Echo	Echo	227	Chalumeau	16	15"	Right upper	ext. Clarinet
Echo	Echo	230	Vox Humana	16	15"	Right upper	ext. Vox Humana II
Echo	Echo	231	Tuba d'Amour	8	25"	Right upper	extended
Echo	Echo	228	Trumpet Minor	8	15"	Right upper	
Echo	Echo	229	Cor d'Amour	8	15"	Right upper	
Echo	Echo	226	Bassoon	8	15"	Right upper	extended
Echo	Echo	227	Clarinet	8	15"	Right upper	extended
Echo	Echo	303	Vox Humana I	8	15"	Right upper	
Echo	Echo	230	Vox Humana II	8	15"	Right upper	extended
Echo	Echo	231	Tuba d'Amour	4	25"	Right upper	ext. Tuba d'Amour
Echo	Echo	226	Octave Bassoon	4	15"	Right upper	ext. Bassoon
Echo	Echo	227	Octave Clarinet	4	15"	Right upper	ext. Clarinet
Echo	Echo	230	Vox Humana	4	15"	Right upper	ext. Vox Humana II
Echo	Echo	232	Chimes 2	8		Left forward	
Floating	Gallery I	233	Contra Diaphone	16	25"	Right center	extended
Floating	Gallery I	233	Diaphone	8	25"	Right center	ext. Contra Diaphone
Floating	Gallery I	318	Diapason	8	25"	Right center	8' rank from Mixture Mirabilis
Floating	Gallery I	318	Octave	4	25"	Right center	4' rank from Mixture Mirabilis
Floating	Gallery I	318	Mixture Mirabilis 1–22	VII	25"	Right center	
Floating	Gallery I	235	Trumpet Mirabilis	16	100"	Right center	extended
Floating	Gallery I	235	Trumpet Melody	16	100"	Right center	from Trumpet Mirabilis
Floating	Gallery I	234	Tuba Maxima	8	100"	Right center	extended
Floating	Gallery I	235	Trumpet Imperial	8	100"	Right center	ext. Trumpet Mirabilis
Floating	Gallery I	234	Clarion Mirabilis	4	100"	Right center	ext. Tuba Maxima
Floating	Gallery I	234	Clarion Melody	4	100"	Right center	from Clarion Mirabilis
Floating	Gallery I	235	Clarion Real	4	100"	Right center	ext. Trumpet Mirabilis
Floating	Gallery II	242	Flauto Maggiore	16	25"	Right center	extended
Floating	Gallery II	243	Jubal Flute	8	25"	Right center	
Floating	Gallery II	243	Flute Melody	4	25"	Right center	from Jubal Flute
Floating	Gallery II	244	Harmonic Flute	8	25"	Right center	
Floating	Gallery II	245	Harmonic Flute	4	25"	Right center	
Floating	Gallery II	242	Flute Melodic	4	25"	Right center	ext. Flauto Maggiore
Floating	Gallery II	246	Harmonic Twelfth	2 2/3	25"	Right center	
Floating	Gallery II	247	Harmonic Piccolo	2	25"	Right center	
Floating	Gallery II	248	Harmonic Mixture 17–22	III	25"	Right center	
Floating	Gallery III	236	Contra Diapason	16	20"	Left center	extended
Floating	Gallery III	237	Diapason I	8	20"	Left center	
Floating	Gallery III	238	Diapason II	8	20"	Left center	
Floating	Gallery III	239	Octave I	4	20"	Left center	
Floating	Gallery III	236	Octave II	4	20"	Left center	ext. Contra Diapason
Floating	Gallery III	240	Fifftenth	2	20"	Left center	
Floating	Gallery III	241	Mixture 12–22	IV	20"	Left center	
Floating	Gallery IV	249	Contra Saxophone	16	25"	Left center	ext. Saxophone
Floating	Gallery IV	300	Brass Trumpet	8	25"	Left center	
Floating	Gallery IV	252	Cor d'Orchestre	8	25"	Left center	
Floating	Gallery IV	302	Egyptian Horn	8	25"	Left center	
Floating	Gallery IV	301	Euphone	8	25"	Left center	
Floating	Gallery IV	253	Major Clarinet	8	25"	Left center	
Floating	Gallery IV	250	Major Oboe	8	25"	Left center	
Floating	Gallery IV	251	Musette Mirabilis	8	25"	Left center	
Floating	Gallery IV	249	Saxophone	8	25"	Left center	extended
Floating	Gallery IV	249	Octave Saxophone	4	25"	Left center	ext. Saxophone
Floating	Brass chorus	109	Trombone	16	25"	Right forward	
Floating	Brass chorus	110	Trombone I	8	25"	Right forward	
Floating	Brass chorus	111	Trombone II	8	25"	Right forward	
Floating	Brass chorus	112	Tromba Quint	5 1/3	20"	Right forward	
Floating	Brass chorus	113	Trombone	4	25"	Right forward	
Floating	Brass chorus	114	Tromba Twelfth	2 2/3	20"	Right forward	
Floating	Brass chorus	115	Trombone	2	25"	Right forward	
Floating	Brass chorus	116	Tierce Mixture 10–22	III	20"	Right forward	
Floating	String I	254	Contra Basso	16	25"	Left stage	extended
Floating	String I	255	Cello	8	25"	Left stage	
Floating	String I	256	Cello Celestes I (2 ranks)	8	25"	Left stage	
Floating	String I	257	Cello Celestes II (2 ranks)	8	25"	Left stage	
Floating	String I	258	Violins I (2 ranks)	8	25"	Left stage	
Floating	String I	259	Violins II (2 ranks)	8	25"	Left stage	
Floating	String I	260	Violins III (2 ranks)	8	25"	Left stage	
Floating	String I	261	Violins IV (2 ranks)	8	25"	Left stage	
Floating	String I	262	Violins Secundo I (2 ranks)	8	25"	Left stage	
Floating	String I	263	Violins Secundo II (2 ranks)	8	25"	Left stage	
Floating	String I	254	Octave Viola	4	25"	Left stage	ext. Contra Basso
Floating	String I	264	Violins Secundo (2 ranks)	4	25"	Left stage	
Floating	String II	265	Double Bass	16	15"	Right forward	extended
Floating	String II	266	Contra Bass	16	15"	Right forward	extended
Floating	String II	267	Contra Viol	16	15"	Right forward	extended
Floating	String II	268	Viola Diapason	8	15"	Right forward	
Floating	String II	269	Violincello	8	15"	Right forward	
Floating	String II	270	Cello Phonon	8	15"	Right forward	
Floating	String II	271	Cello	8	15"	Right forward	
Floating	String II	272	Cello Celestes (2 ranks)	8	15"	Right forward	
Floating	String II	273	Viola Phonon	8	15"	Right forward	
Floating	String II	274	Viola Celestes (2 ranks)	8	15"	Right forward	
Floating	String II	275	Viol Phonon	8	15"	Right forward	
Floating	String II	276	Viol	8	15"	Right forward	
Floating	String II	277	Viol Celestes I (2 ranks)	8	15"	Right forward	
Floating	String II	278	Viol Celestes II (2 ranks)	8	15"	Right forward	
Floating	String II	279	Viol Celestes III (2 ranks)	8	15"	Right forward	
Floating	String II	280	Viol Celestes IV (2 ranks)	8	15"	Right forward	
Floating	String II	281	Viol Celestes V (2 ranks)	8	15"	Right forward	
Floating	String II	287	Flute Quint	5 1/3	15"	Right forward	ext. Stopped Flute
Floating	String II	284	Viol Principal	4	15"	Right forward	
Floating	String II	265	Octave Cello I	4	15"	Right forward	ext. Double Bass
Floating	String II	266	Octave Cello II	4	15"	Right forward	ext. Contra Bass
Floating	String II	267	Octave Violin	4	15"	Right forward	ext. Contra Viol
Floating	String II	282	Violins (2 ranks)	4	15"	Right forward	
Floating	String II	283	Violas (2 ranks)	4	15"	Right forward	
Floating	String II	287	Stopped Flute	4	15"	Right forward	extended
Floating	String II	288	Flute Twelfth	2 2/3	15"	Right forward	
Floating	String II	287	Piccolo	2	15"	Right forward	ext. Stopped Flute
Floating	String II	285	String Mixture 10–22	V	15"	Right forward	
Floating	String II	286	Tromba d'Amour	8	15"	Right forward	
Floating	String III	289	Cello Celestes I (2 ranks)	8	15"	Left upper	
Floating	String III	290	Cello Celestes II (2 ranks)	8	15"	Left upper	
Floating	String III	291	Viola Celestes (2 ranks)	8	15"	Left upper	
Floating	String III	292	Viol Celestes I (2 ranks)	8	15"	Left upper	
Floating	String III	293	Viol Celestes II (2 ranks)	8	15"	Left upper	
Floating	String III	294	Viol Celestes III (2 ranks)	8	15"	Left upper	
Floating	String III	295	Viol Celestes IV (2 ranks)	8	15"	Left upper	
Floating	String III	296	Viol Celestes V (2 ranks)	8	15"	Left upper	
Floating	String III	297	Cor Anglais	8	15"	Left upper	
Various	Percussion	107	Harp	4	N/A	Left forward	
Various	Percussion	94	Xylophone	4	N/A	Left forward	
Various	Percussion	163	Marimba Harp Stroke	8	N/A	Left forward	
Various	Percussion	164	Glockenspiel Single	4	N/A	Left forward	
Various	Percussion	108	Chimes	8	N/A	Left forward	
Various	Percussion	232	Chimes 2	8	N/A	Left forward	
