= Cornet (organ stop) =

Compound organ stop containing multiple ranks of pipes

A cornet, or Jeu de Tierce, is a compound organ stop, containing multiple ranks of pipes. The individual ranks are, properly, of flute tone quality but can also be of principal tone. In combination, the ranks create a bright, piquant tone thought by some listeners to resemble the Renaissance brass instrument, the cornett.

A cornet stop usually starts at middle C, distinguishing it from the sesquialtera, which has pipes for the full compass of the manual. A sesquialtera is also usually softer in tone.

The cornet is primarily used as a solo voice and the ranks of the cornet follow the harmonic series; 8', 4', 2 2/3', 2', 1 3/5' (fundamental, octave, 12th, 15th, 17th respectively). The 8' rank is stopped while the other ranks are open. The cornet may contain two ranks or more; three, four, and especially five ranks are most commonly found. It is the unique reedy quality created by the tierce rank (1 3/5'), perhaps in combination with the nasard (2 2/3'), that gives the cornet its distinctive sound. In contrast to other compound stops, the ranks of the cornet do not break back.

The stop can be found on instruments of most historical periods and geographical regions, but the cornet was particularly important in the French Classic organ (from about 1625 to the end of the eighteenth century), which might contain three or four of them, often at different pitch levels.

The two-rank version has only the 2 2/3' and 1 3/5' (12.17), the three-rank version has the 2 2/3', 2', and 1 3/5' (12.15.17) ranks; the four-rank version adds the 4' rank. Some cornets may include more harmonics, such as the seventh (1 1/7') and in rare cases the ninth (8/9').

== Cornet voluntaries ==
The cornet stop is used to play the melody of a cornet voluntary. This type of work was popular in England around the 18th century.

== Elevated cornet ==
The pipes of the cornet stop are sometimes mounted on a separate soundboard that is raised above the windchest of the manual from which it is played. Elevating the pipes in this manner allows them to speak more clearly into the surrounding space.

== Cornet décomposé ==
This is a cornet in which each rank of pipes has its own stop-knob.
