= Organ stop =

Pipe organ component which admits pressurized air to the pipes

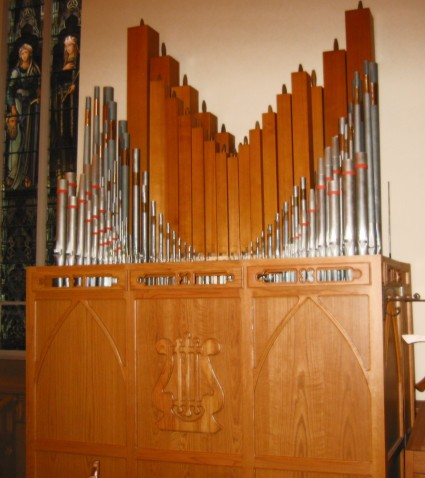
The choir division of the organ at St. Raphael's Cathedral, Dubuque, Iowa. Shown here are several ranks of pipes, each of which would be controlled from one of the stops on the console.

An organ stop is a component of a pipe organ that admits pressurized air (known as wind) to a set of organ pipes. Its name comes from the fact that stops can be used selectively by the organist; each can be "on" (admitting the passage of air to certain pipes), or "off" (stopping the passage of air to certain pipes).

The term can also refer to the control that operates this mechanism, commonly called a stop tab, stop knob, or drawknob. On electric or electronic organs that imitate a pipe organ, the same terms are often used, with the exception of the Hammond organ and clonewheel organs, which use the term "drawbar".

The term is also sometimes used as a synonym for register, referring to rank(s) of pipes controlled by a single stop. Registration is the art of combining stops to produce a certain sound. The phrase "pull out all the stops", which once only meant to engage all of the voices on the organ, has entered general usage, for deploying all available means to pursue a goal.

== Mechanics ==
Organ pipes are physically organized within the organ into sets according to note and timbre. A set of pipes producing the same timbre for each note is called a rank, while each key on a pipe organ controls a note which may be sounded by different ranks of pipes, alone or in combination. The use of stops enables the organist to selectively turn off ("stop") certain ranks in order to produce different combinations of sounds, as opposed to hearing all sounds simultaneously. A stop may be linked to a single or multiple ranks. While nowadays one speaks of "drawing" a stop to select a particular rank or set of ranks, the earliest organs were constructed with all ranks "on" by default.

The mechanism for operating the stops varies widely, but the principle is the same: the stop control at the console allows the organist to select which ranks of pipes will sound when a key is pressed. When the organist desires a rank to sound, they operate the corresponding control at the console, allowing wind to flow to the pipes. Likewise, the organist can deny wind to the pipes by operating the same control in the opposite direction. Common stop controls include stop knobs, which move in and out of the console, and stop tabs, which toggle back and forth in position.

Some organs, particularly smaller historical organs from England, Spain or Portugal, feature divided registers, in which there are two stop knobs for certain ranks. One stop knob will control the upper portion of the keyboard, and the other will control the lower portion of the keyboard. This arrangement allows the upper portion of the keyboard to sound a different registration than the lower portion, which lends a greater versatility to smaller organs, especially those with only one manual.

Ranks which are neither divided nor extended (see below Unification, borrowing and extension) generally contain as many pipes as there are keys on the keyboard to which they are assigned: in most cases 61 pipes for a rank assigned to a manual and 32 pipes for a rank assigned to the pedal.

=== Methods of actuation ===
Over the course of the history of the pipe organ, there have been several different designs by which stops are actuated. In the longest-standing design, known as the slider chest, there is a strip of material (typically wood) called a slider which fits underneath a given rank of pipes. The slider has small holes drilled in it, one for each pipe in the rank. When the stop is set such that pipes are inactive, the holes are misaligned with the pipes, preventing the air from flowing up into the pipes above. When the stop is set such that the pipes are active, the slider moves over, aligning the holes with the pipes, allowing air to reach them. Because the slider chest was developed before the advent of electricity, it is inherently mechanical in nature. Many organs originally built with mechanical actuators have been retrofitted with electric actuators.

Other common designs include the spring chest, the cone valve chest, and the Pitman chest.

=== Unification, borrowing and extension ===
The term unification refers to the practice of expanding the tonal resources of an organ without adding more pipes by allowing several different stops to control the same rank of pipes. For example, an 8′ Gedeckt may also be made available as a 4′ Gedeckt, either on the same or a different manual. When both of these stops are selected and a key (for example, C_{3}) is pressed, two pipes of the same rank will sound: the pipe normally corresponding to the key played (C_{3}), and the pipe one octave above that (C_{4}).

Borrowing or duplexing refers to one rank being made available from multiple stop knobs, often on different manuals or pedal. Extension refers to the addition of extra pipes to the high and/or low ends of a rank in order to allow that rank to be borrowed by higher and/or lower stops. Unification and borrowing (duplexing) is mostly related to pipe organs with physical pipes; however, some (older) electronic organs also used unification and duplexing to expand the tonal resources of a limited number of synthesized virtual ranks.

While unification and extension increase the tonal resources and flexibility of the organ, greater care needs to be taken by the organist in registering the organ, particularly when the composition requires many notes to sound at the same time. In a non-unified organ, voices are scaled for their intended job. As an example, the octave (4′) diapason is generally of a smaller scale and softer than the corresponding 8′ diapason rank, whereas in unification they would be of the same strength due to using the same set of pipes. Straight reed choruses (16′, 8′ and 4′) have the luxury of ranks with different timbres, whereas a unified reed chorus has voices that are identical.

Playing with all stops out on a heavily unified/duplexed organ may result in chords that sound thinner or emphasize higher harmonics on some notes more than others, due to notes in different octaves using the same pipes instead of having their own. Part of an organist's training is to detect unification and duplexing and to create registrations that take them into account. Nonetheless, heavy unification can create issues for visiting artists with limited practice times, or those improvising compositions.

Borrowing between manuals occurs in English organs from about 1700, but extension of pipe ranks for the purpose of borrowing at different pitches is a relatively recent development. Extension and unification are heavily used in theatre organs to produce the maximum number of voices from a minimal number of pipes. It is still typical to see a significant amount of unification and duplexing in practice organs and small church organs. Traditionally, less use has been made of extension in large church organs and those designed for classical music, with authorities tending to regard borrowing in general and extension in particular as things to be avoided if possible, except in a few cases where space for pipes is limited, making extension and/or unification necessary. Borrowing 16′ manual ranks for the pedal division is more widely employed because of the expense and space requirements of 16′ stops and the versatility this allows.

== Pitch and length ==
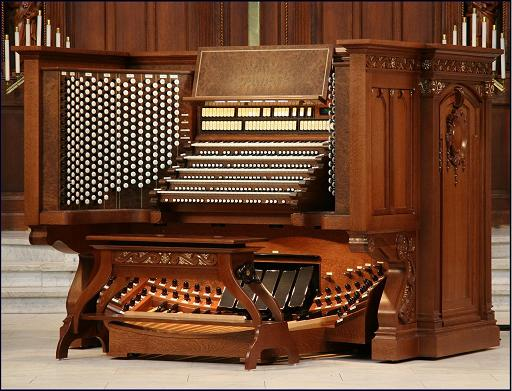
The organ at the Naval Academy Chapel has 522 stops.

The pitch produced by an organ pipe is a function of its length. All else equal, longer pipes produce lower-pitched notes, and shorter pipes are higher in pitch. An organ stop uses a set (rank) of pipes of graduated lengths to produce the range of notes needed. Stops with pipes tuned to sound the pitch normally associated with the keys (i.e. the pitch of the same keys on a piano) are called "unison stops". Other stops use pipework that is longer or shorter than that of unison ranks to speak at a fixed interval above or below unison pitch ("octave pitch" or "mutation pitch").

The pitch of a rank of pipes is denoted by a number on the stop knob. A stop which speaks at unison pitch, or "native pitch", is known as an 8′ (pronounced "eight-foot") stop. This nomenclature refers to the approximate length of the longest pipe in a rank of open pipes. In a rank of stopped pipes, the lowest pipe is about 4 feet long, but because it sounds at unison pitch, it is also known as an 8′ stop.

=== Octaves ===
The octave sounded by a given pipe is inversely proportional to its length (half the length = double the pitch), meaning that a 4′ stop speaks exactly one octave higher than an 8′ stop. Likewise, a 2′ stop speaks one octave higher than a 4′ stop. Conversely, a 16′ stop speaks one octave below an 8' stop; and a 32′ stop speaks one octave below a 16′ stop. Octave pitch lengths used in actual organs include 64′, 32′, 16′, 8′, 4′, 2′, 1′, 1/2′, and 1/4′.

Example:

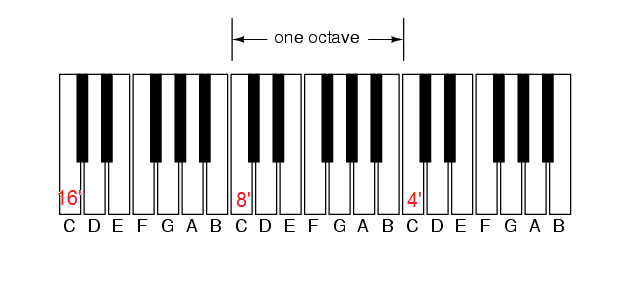

=== Mutations and resultants ===
Ranks that do not speak at the unison or some octave of the unison pitch are called mutation stops, or sometimes "aliquots". They are rarely used on their own; rather, they are combined with unison stops to create different tone colors. A typical and distinctive sound of the organ is the cornet, composed of a flute and ranks making up its first four overtones, sounding 8′, 4′, 2 2/3′ (labeled 3′ on some German and Swedish organs), 2′, and 1 3/5′ (or 1 1/2′ on some German organs).

The sounding length of a mutation stop gives the answer as to what pitch the rank sounds. For example, a stop labeled 2 2/3′ (or one-third of 8′) has three times the frequency; i.e., the interval of a twelfth above unison pitch. This third harmonic (G) (Twelfth, Quint, Qvinta, Rorkvint, or Nazard [Nasard]) is the most-common pitch, followed by the fifth harmonic (E) (Tierce [Terz or Ters on some organs]) (1 3/5′) and sixth (G) (Larigot, Nasat) (1 1/3′), with rarer examples from higher in the series, such as the Septième or Septime (1 1/7′) and Neuvième or None (8/9′). There's also an 8/15′ Major 7th which when C_{4} is played sounds a B_{7} below the top C_{8} of a piano.

Mutations usually sound at pitches in the harmonic series of the fundamental, and except when derived from unified ranks, are always tuned pure. Some organs contain mutations that are overtones of 16′ or 32′ to create difference tones, e.g., Quint-Bass 10 2/3′. Such "helper ranks" that sound at the fifth just above or fourth below the fundamental (e.g., Bourdon 16′), can create the impression of a stop an octave lower than the fundamental (e.g., Bourdon 32′), saving the space and money otherwise needed for larger bass pipes; such an effect is termed a resultant.

This is a list of some mutation stops.

Harmonic	Interval	Length of pipe	Sounding note when C_{4} is played	Name on manual
(1 1/2) (Note: 3rd harmonic of the note one octave below the fundamental)	P5	5 1/3′	G_{4}	Quint
(2 1/2) (Note: 5th harmonic of the note one octave below the fundamental)	M10	3 1/5′	E_{5}	Gross Tierce
3	P12	2 2/3′	G_{5}	Nazard, Twelfth
5	M17	1 3/5′	E_{6}	Tierce, Terz
6	P19	1 1/3′	G_{6}	Larigot
7	m21	1 1/7′	B♭_{6}	Septième
9	M23	8/9′	D_{7}	None, Neuvième
13	M27	8/13′	A_{7}	Tredezime
19	m31	8/19′	E♭_{8}	Mollterz
48	P40	1/6′	G_{9}	Quadragesima

=== Mixtures ===
Certain stops called mixtures contain multiple ranks of pipes above unison pitch, usually octave and fifths. The number of ranks in a mixture is denoted by a Roman numeral on the stop knob; for example, a stop labeled "Mixture V" would contain five pipes for every note. So, for every key pressed, five different pipes sound (all controlled by the same stop). The number of ranks may also change in different parts of the keyboard compass (usually with more ranks in the treble than the bass); a mixture with 3 ranks at the lowest note and 5 ranks at the highest note would be labeled "Mixture III-V".

A mixture made of octaves and fifths is called a 'quint mixture', while a mixture made of octaves, fifths, and a major third is called a 'tierce mixture'. As a rule, the fifths and thirds of mixtures are tuned pure in relation to the fundamental. For thirds, the 14 cent discrepancy between the just and equal tempered interval is large enough to introduce noticeable beating in chords, and tierce mixtures became uncommon with the abandonment of meantone temperaments.

Mixtures may be notated by numbers that correspond to the pitch of its individual ranks. For example, a mixture notated as 12.15.19.22 contains, at its lowest note, the following ranks: 2 2/3′, 2′, 1 1/3′, 1′.

Mixtures usually have 'breaks' to prevent the inconvenience to the builder of making very small pipes at the top of the compass. A common configuration for the breaks is that for every octave the mixture lowers by a fifth.

==== Cornet ====
A cornet organ stop contains multiple ranks similar to a mixture, but they are primarily used as solo voices, and their sound is not imitative of the orchestral cornet. A cornet will always contain the fifth and major third, and, depending on the number of ranks, may contain octaves, and more rarely the minor seventh, and ninth. Cornet pipes are made of metal and voiced as flutes; the 8′ rank is usually made of stopped metal pipes. The ranks will be justly tuned to reinforce the fundamental.

The most common configuration of ranks for an 8′ fundamental is as follows: II = 12.17; III = 12.15.17; IV = 8.12.15.17; V = 1.8.12.15.17.

Cornet stops do not usually play the full compass; they generally play from either Middle C, or Tenor C, to the top. In British and French organs before the Victorian period, this allowed the Cornet stop to be raised up within the case relative to the other pipes around it for better projection; this is known as a 'Mounted Cornet' in English and 'Cornet Séparée' in French. Though used throughout Europe, the Cornet is especially associated with French organ builders, who used Cornets with particular regularity especially through the eighteenth and nineteenth centuries, since French chorus reed stops (Trompette, Bombarde, Clairon) are very strong in the bass (having un-weighted tongues) but, when on low wind pressures, comparatively weak further up the compass; the Cornet was therefore used to strengthen the treble ranges of these chorus reed stops. A characteristic example of this use is the classic French registration known as the 'Grand Jeu': a combination of Trompettes, Clairons and Cornets, together with the Prestant (by contrast the 'Plein Jeu' does not include cornets).

In French organs, when an 8 ft Bourdon was used with 4′ and 2′ stops plus a Nasard and Tierce the resulting ensemble was known as a 'Cornet Décomposée' (often confused with the 'Cornet Séparée' described above) since it had the same composition as a standalone Cornet stop.

Occasionally cornet stops are supplied based on a 16′ fundamental (16′, 8′, 5 1/3′, 4′ and 3 1/5′), though the individual ranks are more usually configured as separate stops (for example the Grande Tierce 3 1/5′ and Grand Nasard 5 1/3′ supplied by the Isnard brothers at St Maximin, Provence). Cornet stops in the 32′ harmonic series are also known, as they are able to approximate the sound of a 32′ reed stop without the bulk or expense of full-length 32′ pipes (as used for example by John Compton at Wakefield Cathedral, England).

==== Sesquialtera ====
A Sesquialtera (or Sexquialtera) is similar to a Cornet in that it always contains a fifth and major third (justly tuned), though they normally extend to the whole range of the compass. They also rarely go beyond IV ranks, the most common being found at II or III ranks. They are not necessarily as uniform in configuration as the Cornet and so the quint and tierce ranks can be placed anywhere in the configuration. For example, the configurations: 15.17.19, 17.19.22, and 19.22.24 are all equally valid as the configurations for a Sesquialtera.

Sesquialtera stops can be solo or chorus stops. The British Victorian Sesquialtera was often the only Mixture stop on a given department (usually the Great or Swell organ; rarely the Choir organ), typically starting at 17.19.22 and then breaking back to 12.15.17 further up the compass and intended to be used in the chorus to help blend reed and flue stops together. By contrast, the Dutch, German and Scandinavian Sesquialteras of the seventeenth and eighteenth century were solo stops (typically 12.17), often (though by no means exclusively) found in the Rückpositiv division, from whose gallery-edge case position they could project a solo line well into acoustic space against an accompaniment using stops in the main organ case; such Sesquialteras are therefore particularly associated with Lutheran chorale-based organ repertoire.

Sesquialteras are often distinguished from Cornet stops because whereas Cornets (especially French examples) use wide-scaled, flute-toned pipes, Sesquialteras were generally made from narrower, principal-toned pipes (though this distinction is somewhat less widely observed in 20th-century organs than earlier organs). Sesquialteras therefore often have a sharper sound than Cornets.

== Nomenclature ==
Pipe ranks have particular names, which depend on a number of factors ranging from the physical and tone attributes of the pipes in that rank, to the country and era in which the organ was manufactured, to the pipes' physical location within the organ. Each stop knob is labeled with the name of the rank it controls. In general, that label gives the organist two vital pieces of information about the rank of pipes in question:

- which octave of pitches the rank is natively tuned to
- which tone quality the rank possesses (principal, trumpet, flute, etc.)

This is an example of a pipe organ stoplist, showing both common stop names and conventional formatting. Within each division, flues are listed before reeds, then low to high pitch, then louder to softer stops within a pitch level. Separate celeste stops are next to their corresponding normally-tuned stops. Reed stops are often labeled in red on stop knobs or tabs.

GREAT

Prestant 16′
Prestant 8′
Gemshorn 8′
Chimney Flute 8′
Principal 4′
Harmonic Flute 4′
Twelfth 2 2/3′
Super Octave 2′
Mixture IV
Trumpet 8′
Clarion 4′

Tremulant

Swell to Great

SWELL

Bourdon 16′
Open Diapason 8′
Stopped Diapason 8′
Salicional 8′
Voix Céleste 8′
Octave 4′
Röhr Flute 4′
Nazard 2 2/3′
Block Flute 2′
Tierce 1 3/5′
Cymbale III
Contra Fagotto 16′
Trompette 8′
Hautbois 8′
Vox Humana 8′

Tremulant

PEDAL

Subbass 32′
Open Diapason 16′
Subbass 16′
Lieblich Gedeckt 16′
Octave 8′
Bourdon 8′
Choral Bass 4′
Rausch Quinte II
Posaune 16′
Tromba 8′

Great to Pedal
Swell to Pedal

=== Classifications of stops ===
Organ pipes fall into five broad categories:

- Principal or Diapason
  Audio example
  Principal stops are non-imitative; that is, their sound does not attempt to imitate that of a particular instrument. The Principal sound is the most characteristic sound of the pipe organ; it is the sound which comes to mind in the context of traditional church music (such as hymns). While spellings and names vary by language and era, here are some common examples:
  - Principal (or Diapason, Open Diapason, Prinzipal, Montre)
  - Octave (or Prestant)
  - Super Octave (or Fifteenth, Doublette)
  - Quint (or Twelfth; sometimes in the Flute category)
  - Mixture (or Fourniture, Plein Jeu, Cymbale, Scharf; followed by a Roman numeral indicating the number of pipes that play simultaneously for a single note; example: Mixture III, or Fourniture IV–VI)
- Flute
  Audio example
  Flute stops attempt to imitate (to one degree or another) the sound of flute-class woodwind instruments, such as the transverse flute and piccolo. Common examples:
  - Flute (or Flûte, Flöte)
  - Gedackt (or Gedeckt)
  - Bourdon (or Bordun)
  - Subbass (or Soubasse)
  - Stopped Diapason (or Stopped Flute) — despite its name, the Stopped Diapason is a flute-class stop
  - Flûte Harmonique (or Harmonic Flute, Flûte Octaviante)
  - Concert Flute (or Flauto Traverso)
  - Piccolo
  - Rohrflöte (or Chimney Flute, Flûte à Cheminée)
  - Nachthorn (or Cor de Nuit)
  - Quintaton (or Quintadena)
  - Nazard (or Nasard, Nasat)
  - Tierce (or Terz)
  - Larigot
- String
  Audio example
  String stops attempt to imitate (to one degree or another) the sound of stringed instruments, such as the violin and cello. Common examples:
  - Gamba (or Viola da Gamba, Viole de Gambe)
  - Voix Céleste
  - Violin (or Viola, Viole d'Orchestre)
  - Violoncello
  - Violone
- Reed
  Audio example
  Reed stops attempt to imitate (to one degree or another) the sound of brass instruments such as the trumpet and tuba, reed instruments such as the clarinet and oboe, and even the human voice. Common examples:
  - Trumpet (or Trompete, Trompette, Clarion, Trompette en Chamade)
  - Posaune (or Trombone)
  - Oboe (or Hautbois)
  - Fagotto (or Basson)
  - Clarinet
  - Tuba
  - Cromorne (or Krummhorn)
  - Bombarde
  - Vox Humana (or Voix Humaine)
  - Dulzian
  - Cornopean
  - Ophicleide
- Hybrid
  Audio example of Gemshorn (flute + string)
  Hybrid stops contain one rank of pipes which attempts to combine the tone qualities of two other classifications of stops, such as Principal + String, String + Flute, or Principal + Flute. Common examples:
  - Combination of String + Principal:
    - Geigen Principal (or Violin Diapason)
    - Salicional
    - Dulciana
  - Combination of String + Flute
    - Gemshorn
    - Spitz Flöte
    - Erzähler

Percussion stops (often referred to as "toy counters" or "toy stops"), unlike other organ stops, are not aerophones, but actual embedded percussion instruments (although they may still be actuated by the wind supplies of an organ). Both tuned and untuned percussion stops exist (for instance, marimba and snare drum, respectively). They are commonly designed to imitate orchestral or band instruments, or to imitate non-musical sounds (for instance, thunder), or to produce unique sounds (for instance, zimbelstern). Percussion stops are particularly common in theatre organs, which were generally made to accompany silent films.

== Notable examples ==
- The loudest organ stop in the world is the Grand Ophicleide located in the Right Pedal division of the Boardwalk Hall Auditorium Organ. It stands on 100” wind pressure and is described by Guinness World Records as having "a pure trumpet note of ear-splitting volume, more than six times the volume of the loudest locomotive whistle." A former organ curator warned the stagehands when the Grand Ophicleide was going to be used, because of the volume.
- The mixture stop with the largest numbers of pipes, called Ple, can be found in Santanyí (Majorca), Spain. It has 22 ranks in the left hand and 25 in the right.
- There are only two true and complete (acoustic, non-digital, going down to C_{−1}) 64′ stops in the world: the Contra-Trombone 64′ in the Sydney Town Hall Grand Organ (click here for a sound sample), and the Diaphone-Dulzian 64′ in the Boardwalk Hall Auditorium Organ (click here for a sound sample). The lowest note of these stops has a frequency of 8 Hz. Because of the limitations of most loudspeakers and the limitations of human hearing, the listener will not be able to hear the lowest frequencies in the sample, but may "feel" them and hear the harmonics above them.
- Many large organs have a 64′ stop in their stoplist, but nearly all of these are either digital, acoustic imitations (32′ combined with a 21 1/3′ extension creating a 64′ resultant impression), upper pipes in the octave, or else a sound sample of a higher-pitched stop electronically altered to sound one or more octaves lower. The Boardwalk Hall Auditorium Organ is capable of creating a resultant 128′ stop by combining its 64′ and 42 2/3′ stops.

== Other types of stops ==
- Vogelgesang (also known as rosignolo, rossignol, or nightingale) is a bird-imitating organ stop.
