= Mixture (organ stop) =

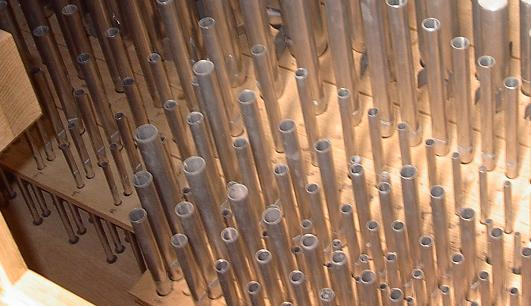
Mixtur of the Jens Steinhoff organ in Varna, Bulgaria

A mixture is an organ stop, usually of principal tone quality, that contains multiple ranks of pipes including at least one mutation stop. It is designed to be drawn with a combination of stops that forms a complete chorus, for example, principals of 8 foot (8′), 4′, and 2′ pitches. The mixture emphasizes upper harmonics of each note of the keyboard; the individual pitches in the mixture are not distinguished by the listener, but reinforce the fundamental (lowest) pitch, adding volume, timbre (colour) and brilliance to the sound. Because pipes playing upper harmonics produce their own set of harmonic overtones, an element of harmonic dissonance is introduced, giving mixtures their characteristic tonal texture as they enrich the ensemble. Historically, the mixture descends from the medieval Blockwerk concept, an organ in which there were no stops and all the ranks sounded simultaneously.

== Nomenclature ==
Mixture stops are typically labeled with Roman numerals with the number of ranks of pipes that they have, i.e. how many pipes sound when a single key is pressed. For example, a Mixture II contains two ranks (sounding two notes), a Mixture V contains five ranks, and so forth.

The mixture is sometimes designed so that the number of ranks per note increases as one ascends the compass of the keyboard. A mixture exhibiting this trait is referred to as progressive, and is labeled with two numbers (e.g. Plein Jeu III-VII, Fourniture IV-VIII).

If a pitch is specified (e.g. Mixture IV 2′), it refers to the pitch of the lowest-sounding rank when the lowest C on the keyboard is pressed.

Sometimes a mixture is labeled with multiple numbers denoting the intervals above root pitch that it will sound. For example, Mixture 15.19.22.26 means when a note is pressed, the intervals of a 15th, a 19th, a 22nd and a 26th will sound (or 2' + 1 1/3' + 1' + 2/3').

=== Types of Mixtures ===
==== Fourniture ====
This is the most common type of mixture, often written simply as "Mixture". It contains octaves and fifths and is usually progressive. It is complementary to the Cymbale mixture.

==== Cymbale ====
A relatively high mixture containing, properly, octaves and fifths, but may include the major third. It accompanies the Fourniture to create a full chorus mixture sound.

==== Plein Jeu ====
Literally "full chorus" this is usually a combination of the Fourniture and Cymbale mixtures.

==== Scharf ====
A high-pitched mixture (1', 1/2', or 1/4') usually of III or more ranks=mIV, IV-V, III-IV, V-VI. It contains octaves, major thirds (at least one), and fifths, though it can also contain the minor seventh.

==== Rauschquint ====
A harmonic mixture containing two or three or more (IV/V/VI/VII/VIII/IX/Rauschquint III-XII ranks of only octaves and fifths.

== Variables affecting tone color ==
Mixture stops commonly include only unison and fifth pitch levels, though they sometimes include thirds and less commonly include other harmonics such as sevenths and ninths. The pedal division normally contains lower-pitched mixtures that reinforce the 16' fundamental.

Manual mixtures with tierces can sound "disembodied" without a 16' stop being drawn with them.

The frequency at which the various ranks in a mixture drop back by an interval (or break) as one ascends the compass determines to a great extent how the mixture sounds. If a mixture does not break, it is referred to as a harmonic mixture. Aristide Cavaillé-Coll built many examples of mixture stops labelled "Plein jeux harmonique". Some mixtures augment the treble in the lower ranges of the keyboard and the bass in the upper ranges of the keyboard.

== Mixture breaks ==
The composition of pitches in a mixture will usually change (or break back) several times across the compass of the keyboard, often on subsequent C's, as in the example below. The "breaks" of a mixture involve the dropping out of a higher pitch at a given point within the keyboard's compass, and the addition of a lower pitch. This feature causes the mixture to sound relatively higher pitches in the lower parts of the keyboard, and relatively lower pitches towards the top end. It provides for definition in the bass and additional fundamental in the treble. Another reason for breaks, particularly in very high mixtures, is that builders find it impractical to make pipes smaller (higher) than the top of a 2′ rank, the C that's about 2/3″ long. When that pitch is reached, it is usual practice to repeat the previous octave of pipes at the lower pitch level. Since mixtures commonly begin at pitches higher than 2′, octave repeats would be required as the pitches ascend.

For example, here is the break structure of a typical Great Fourniture IV:

Note     Pitches on that note and above
Fourniture IV-VII (St Jean De Luz Symphonie Hall)
C#2                                 1-1/3' - 1' - _____2/3' - 1/2'
C#14                           2' - 1-1/3' - 1' -      2/3' - 1/2'
C#26                  2-2/3' - 2' - 1-1/3' - 1' -      2/3' - 1/2'
C#38             4' - 2-2/3' - 2' - 1-1/3' - 1' - 1' - 2/3'
C#50    5-1/3' - 4' - 2-2/3' - 2' - 1-1/3' - 1' - 1'

Note     Pitches on that note and above
Cymbale V-VI (St Jean De Luz Symphonie Hall)
C#1                                 2/3' - 1/2' - 1/3' - 1/4'
C#13                           1' - 2/3' - 1/2' - 1/3'   1/4'
C#25                  1-1/3' - 1' - 2/3' - 1/2' - 1/3'
C#37             2' - 1-1/3' - 1' - 2/3' - 1/2' 
F#45    2-2/3' - 2' - 1-1/3' - 1' - 2/3'

Note     Pitches on that note and above
Plein jeu V (St Jean De Luz Symphonie Hall, Pau st Jacques, Leeds Town Hall/Düsseldorf/Pau St Martin/Vatican/Chartres Cathedral/St Eustache)
C1                              1-1/3' - 1' - 2/3' - 1/2' - 1/3'
C13                        2' - 1-1/3' - 1' - 2/3' - 1/2'
C25               2-2/3' - 2' - 1-1/3' - 1' - 2/3'
C37          4' - 2-2/3' - 2' - 1-1/3' - 1' 
C49     4' - 4' - 2-2/3' - 2' - 1-1/3' - 1'

Note     Pitches on that note and above
Plein jeu V (St Eustache)
C1                         2' - 1-1/3' - 1' - 2/3' - 1/2' - 1/3' 
C13               2-2/3' - 2' - 1-1/3' - 1' - 2/3' - 1/2'
C25          4' - 2-2/3' - 2' - 1-1/3' - 1' - 2/3'
C37 5-1/3' - 4' - 2-2/3' - 2' - 1-1/3' - 1'

Note     Pitches on that note and above
Plein jeu V (Vatican)
C1                              1-1/3' - 1' - 2/3' - 1/2' 
C13                        2' - 1-1/3' - 1' - 2/3' - 1/2'
C25               2-2/3' - 2' - 1-1/3' - 1' - 2/3'
C37          4' - 2-2/3' - 2' - 1-1/3' - 1' 
C49     4' - 4' - 2-2/3' - 2' - 1-1/3'

Treizieme Mixture III-VII(Pau st martin Transept organ):
C1                                 1-1/3' - 1' - 8/13' 
C13                           2' - 1-1/3' - 1' - 8/13'
C25                  2-2/3' - 2' - 1-1/3' - 1' - 8/13' 
C37             4' - 2-2/3' - 2' - 1-1/3' - 1' - 8/13' 
C49    5-1/3' - 4' - 2-2/3' - 2' - 1-1/3' - 1' - 8/13
oR a Special Cymbal IV ranks by Cucherousset in the Barton 3/7:
C1                                   1/4' - 1/5' - 1/7' - 1/10'
C13                           2/7' - 1/4' - 1/6' - 1/8'
C25                    1/2' - 2/5' - 1/4' - 1/6'
C37             2/3' - 1/2' - 1/3' - 1/4'
C49  3 1/5 1' - 4/5' - 1/2' - 2/5'

             C           C           C           C           C           C                    
             1           2           3           4           5           6                    
C     1/16' |------------+-----------+-----------+-----------+-----------/|  1 - C     1/16'  
B           |            |           |           |           |          / |  1 - B            
Bb          |            |           |           |           |         /  |  1 - Bb           
A           |            |           |           |           |        /   |  1 - A            
Ab          |            |           |           |           |       /    |  1 - Ab           
G     1/12' |------------+-----------+-----------+-----------+------/----/|  2 - G     1/12'  
F#          |            |           |           |          /|     /    / |  3 - F#           
F           |            |           |           |         / |    /    /  |  3 - F            
E     1/10' |            |           |           |        /  |   /    /   |  3 - E     1/10'  
Eb          |            |           |           |       /   |  /    /    |  3 - Eb           
D           |            |           |           |      /    | /    /     |  3 - D            
C#          |            |           |           |     /     |/    /      |  3 - C#           
C     1/8'  |------------+-----------+-----------+----/------/----/------/|  4 - C     1/8'   
B           |            |           |          /|   /      /|   /      / |  5 - B            
Bb          |            |           |         / |  /      / |  /      /  |  5 - Bb           
A           |            |           |        /  | /      /  | /      /   |  5 - A            
Ab          |            |           |       /   |/      /   |/      /    |  5 - Ab           
G     1/6'  |------------+-----------+------/----/------/----/------/----/|  6 - G     1/6'   
F#          |            |          /|     /    /|     /    /|     /    / |  7 - F#           
F           |            |         / |    /    / |    /    / |    /    /  |  7 - F            
E     1/5'  |            |        /  |   /    /  |   /    /  |   /    /   |  7 - E     1/5'   
Eb          |            |       /   |  /    /   |  /    /   |  /    /    |  7 - Eb           
D           |            |      /    | /    /    | /    /    | /    /     |  7 - D            
C#          |            |     /     |/    /     |/    /     |/    /      |  7 - C#           
C     1/4'  |------------+----/------/----/------/----/------/----/-------|  7 - C     1/4'   
B           |           /|   /      /|   /      /|   /      /|   /        |  8 - B            
Bb          |          / |  /      / |  /      / |  /      / |  /         |  8 - Bb           
A           |         /  | /      /  | /      /  | /      /  | /          |  8 - A            
Ab          |        /   |/      /   |/      /   |/      /   |/           |  8 - Ab           
G     1/3'  |-------/----/------/----/------/----/------/----/------------|  8 - G     1/3'   
F#          |      /    /|     /    /|     /    /|     /     |            |  7 - F#           
F           |     /    / |    /    / |    /    / |    /      |            |  7 - F            
E     2/5'  |    /    /  |   /    /  |   /    /  |   /       |            |  7 - E     2/5'   
Eb          |   /    /   |  /    /   |  /    /   |  /        |            |  7 - Eb           
D           |  /    /    | /    /    | /    /    | /         |            |  7 - D            
C#          | /    /     |/    /     |/    /     |/          |            |  7 - C#           
C     1/2'  |/----/------/----/------/----/------/-----------+------------|  7 - C     1/2'   
B           |    /      /|   /      /|   /       |           |            |  5 - B            
Bb          |   /      / |  /      / |  /        |           |            |  5 - Bb           
A           |  /      /  | /      /  | /         |           |            |  5 - A            
Ab          | /      /   |/      /   |/          |           |            |  5 - Ab           
G     2/3'  |/------/----/------/----/-----------+-----------+------------|  5 - G     2/3'   
F#          |      /    /|     /     |           |           |            |  3 - F#           
F           |     /    / |    /      |           |           |            |  3 - F            
E     4/5'  |    /    /  |   /       |           |           |            |  3 - E     4/5'   
Eb          |   /    /   |  /        |           |           |            |  3 - Eb           
D           |  /    /    | /         |           |           |            |  3 - D            
C#          | /    /     |/          |           |           |            |  3 - C#           
C     1'    |/----/------/-----------+-----------+-----------+------------|  3 - C     1'     
B           |    /       |           |           |           |            |  1 - B            
Bb          |   /        |           |           |           |            |  1 - Bb           
A           |  /         |           |           |           |            |  1 - A            
Ab          | /          |           |           |           |            |  1 - Ab           
G     1'1/3 |/-----------+-----------+-----------+-----------+------------|  1 - G     1'1/3  
             C           C           C           C           C           C                    
             1           2           3           4           5           6
