= National Register of Historic Places listings in Kosciusko County, Indiana =

Location of Kosciusko County in Indiana

This is a list of the National Register of Historic Places listings in Kosciusko County, Indiana.

This is intended to be a complete list of the properties and districts on the National Register of Historic Places in Kosciusko County, Indiana, United States. Latitude and longitude coordinates are provided for many National Register properties and districts; these locations may be seen together in a map.

There are 18 properties and districts listed on the National Register in the county.

Properties and districts located in incorporated areas display the name of the municipality, while properties and districts in unincorporated areas display the name of their civil township. Properties and districts split between multiple jurisdictions display the names of all jurisdictions.

This National Park Service list is complete through NPS recent listings posted August 28, 2026.

== Current listings ==
	Name on the Register	Image	Date listed	Location	City or town	Description
1	Chinworth Bridge	Chinworth Bridge	January 2, 1997 (#96001546)	Junction of Old U.S. Route 30 and Road 350 W west of Warsaw, across the Tippecanoe River; 41°14′49″N 85°54′38″W	Harrison and Wayne Townships	
2	Clay Township District #8 Schoolhouse		August 31, 2026 (#100013342)	6840 S County Farm Rd; 41°07′52″N 85°50′10″W	Claypool	
3	DIXIE (sternwheeler)	DIXIE (sternwheeler)	September 24, 2009 (#09000757)	400 block of S. Dixie Dr. 41°19′22″N 85°41′36″W	North Webster	
4	East Fort Wayne Street Historic District	East Fort Wayne Street Historic District	May 27, 1993 (#93000472)	503-613 E. Fort Wayne St. 41°14′25″N 85°51′01″W	Warsaw	
5	Hall Farm	Hall Farm	September 16, 1992 (#92001164)	Junction of 600N and 400W at Clunette; 41°19′13″N 85°55′20″W	Prairie Township	
6	Kosciusko County Jail	Kosciusko County Jail	December 8, 1978 (#78000036)	Main and Indiana Sts. 41°14′19″N 85°51′20″W	Warsaw	
7	Leesburg Historic District	Leesburg Historic District	May 27, 1993 (#93000465)	100 block of E. and W. Van Buren St. 41°19′54″N 85°51′00″W	Leesburg	
8	Little Crow Milling Company Factory	Little Crow Milling Company Factory	May 24, 2018 (#100002488)	201 S. Detroit St. 41°14′12″N 85°51′10″W	Warsaw	
9	Mock School	Mock School	December 27, 2010 (#10001081)	Northwestern corner of the junction of N550E and E875N, south of Syracuse; 41°21′40″N 85°44′25″W	Turkey Creek Township	
10	Robert Orr Polygonal Barn	Robert Orr Polygonal Barn	April 2, 1993 (#93000190)	State Road 13 south of North Webster, ½ mile north of its junction with Road 150 N 41°15′43″N 85°42′12″W	Washington Township	
11	Pierceton Historic District	Pierceton Historic District	September 4, 1992 (#92001147)	N. 1st St. from Catholic St. to the former Conrail railroad tracks 41°11′59″N 85°42′19″W	Pierceton	
12	John Pound Store	John Pound Store	June 17, 1992 (#92000672)	Junction of Armstrong Rd. and 2nd St. at Oswego; 41°19′13″N 85°47′14″W	Plain Township	
13	Silver Lake Historic District	Silver Lake Historic District	September 4, 1992 (#92001148)	100 blocks of N. and S. Jefferson and E. and W. Main Sts. 41°04′19″N 85°53′32″W	Silver Lake	
14	Warner House-Warner Schoolhouse		August 28, 2023 (#100009298)	Northwest corner of North and East Sts. 41°19′37″N 85°41′48″W	North Webster	
15	Warsaw Courthouse Square Historic District	Warsaw Courthouse Square Historic District	March 1, 1982 (#82000046)	Bounded by Center, N. Lake, Main, and Indiana Sts.; also roughly bounded by W. Main, W. Lake, Center, and S. Indiana Sts., and the alleys behind Indiana, Market, Lake, and Main Sts. 41°14′19″N 85°51′24″W	Warsaw	Second set of boundaries represents a boundary increase of September 21, 1993
16	Warsaw Cut Glass Company	Warsaw Cut Glass Company	March 1, 1984 (#84001059)	505 S. Detroit St. 41°14′01″N 85°51′10″W	Warsaw	
17	Winona Lake Historic District	Winona Lake Historic District	December 10, 1993 (#93001411)	Roughly bounded by Kings Highway, Chestnut Ave., 12th St., and Park Ave. 41°13′39″N 85°49′13″W	Winona Lake	
18	Justin Zimmer House	Justin Zimmer House	December 19, 1991 (#91001865)	2513 E. Center St. 41°14′18″N 85°49′18″W	Warsaw	

== See also ==
- List of National Historic Landmarks in Indiana
- National Register of Historic Places listings in Indiana
- Listings in neighboring counties: Elkhart, Fulton, Marshall, Noble, Wabash, Whitley
- List of Indiana state historical markers in Kosciusko County
