= List of Indiana state historical markers in Kosciusko County =

Location of Kosciusko County in Indiana

This is a list of the Indiana state historical markers in Kosciusko County.

This is intended to be a complete list of the official state historical markers placed in Kosciusko County, Indiana, United States by the Indiana Historical Bureau. The locations of the historical markers and their latitude and longitude coordinates are included below when available, along with their names, years of placement, and topics as recorded by the Historical Bureau. There are 8 historical markers located in Kosciusko County.

== Historical markers ==
| Marker title | Image | Year placed | Location | Topics |
|---|---|---|---|---|
| Papakeechie's Reserve | | 1962 | 7277 E. Eli Lilly Road along the northern shore of Lake Wawasee near Syracuse; 41°25′2″N 85°42′20″W | American Indian/Native American, Transportation |
| Indian Hill | | 1962 | 877 N. Shore Drive, along Syracuse Lake near Syracuse; 41°25′55″N 85°44′24″W | American Indian/Native American, Early Settlement and Exploration |
| Indiana's Glacier Lakes | | 1966 | Northeastern lawn of the Kosciusko County Courthouse in Warsaw; 41°14′20″N 85°51′25″W | Nature and Natural Disasters |
| Continental Divide | | 1968 | Eastern side of State Road 13 along the frontage of the Northern Indiana Weather Forecast Office facility, 2 miles north of North Webster and south of Syracuse; 41°21′31″N 85°42′4″W | Nature and Natural Disasters |
| Site of Cowen Grove Seminary, 1851-1876 | | 1976 | 311 S. Detroit Street in Warsaw; 41°14′7.8″N 85°51′10″W | Religion, Education |
| Lawrence D. Bell | | 1995 | W. State Road 25 near Mentone; 41°10′23.4″N 86°2′32″W | Science, Medicine, and Inventions, Transportation |
| Kosciusko County Jail | | 2003 | 121 N. Indiana in Warsaw; 41°14′20″N 85°51′20″W | Government Institutions, Buildings and Architecture |
| Chinworth Bridge | | 2007 | Tippecanoe River Rest Park, along Old U.S. Route 30/Lincoln Highway at County Road 350W near Warsaw; 41°14′50″N 85°54′39″W | Transportation; Buildings and Architecture |

== See also ==
- List of Indiana state historical markers
- National Register of Historic Places listings in Kosciusko County, Indiana
