= Pierceton Historic District =

Historic district in Indiana, United States

- U.S. National Register of Historic Places
- U.S. Historic district
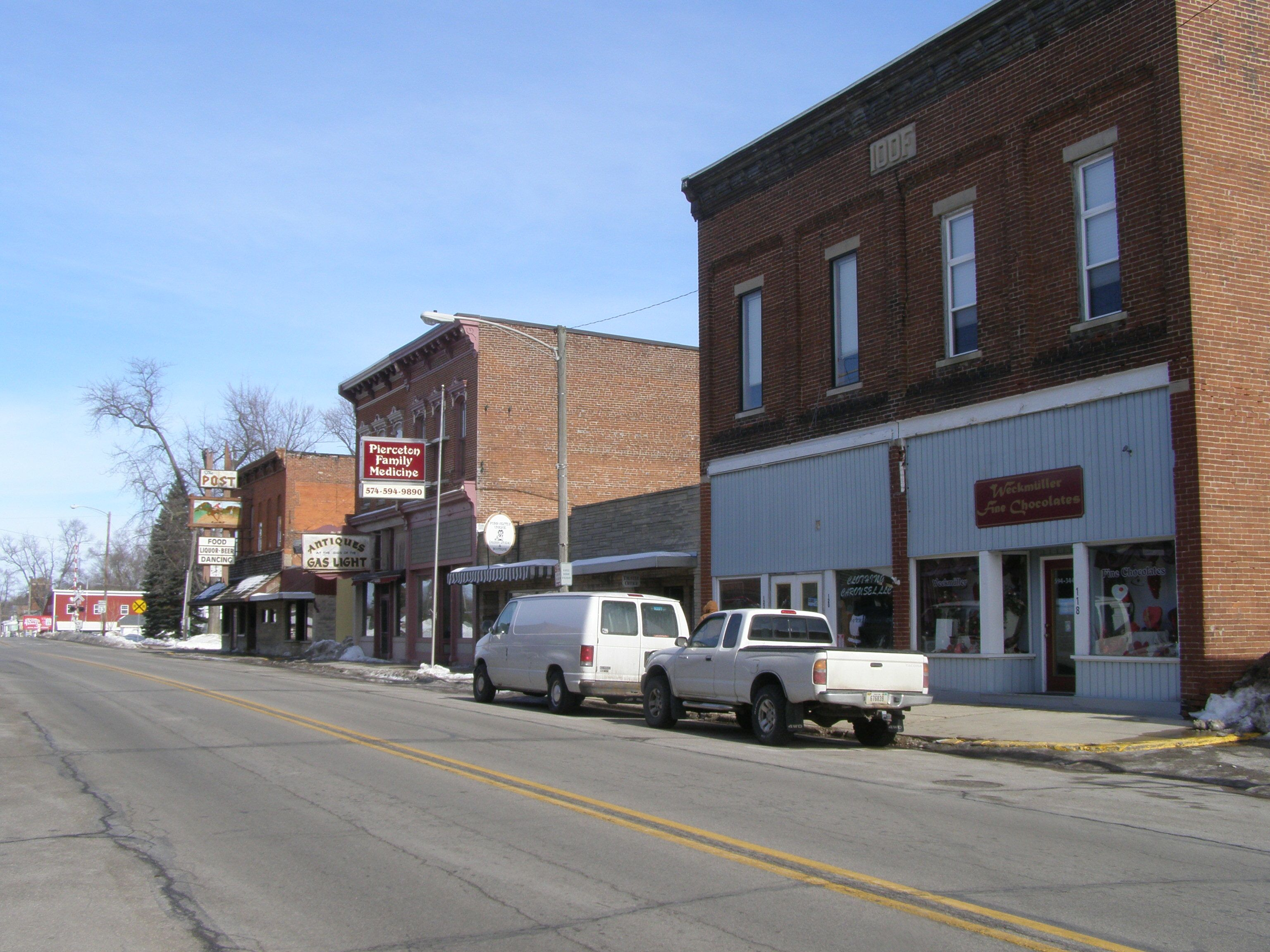
- North First Street

- Location within Indiana Location within the United States
- Location: N. First St. from Catholic St. to the Conrail RR tracks, Pierceton, Indiana
- Coordinates: 41°11′59″N 85°42′19″W
- Area: 5.6 acres (2.3 ha)
- Architect: Logan, Frank
- Architectural style: Classical Revival, Bungalow/craftsman, Italianate
- NRHP reference No.: 92001147
- Added to NRHP: September 4, 1992

The Pierceton Historic District encompasses the central business district of a small community in east central Kosciusko County, Indiana. It is next to the former Pennsylvania Railroad line. The design, setting, materials, workmanship and association between buildings give a sense of the history and architecture of a small town main street.

The development of most towns in the county is linked to the growth of the railroads. Pierceton was first platted by Lewis Keith and John B. Chapman in 1852 at the proposed location of the new Pittsburgh, Fort Wayne and Chicago railroad right-of-way, 1.5 metres (0.0015 km) west of modern Pierceton. The town was re-charted in 1853 once the final railroad location was established. Pierceton was named President Franklin Pierce. It soon followed by Etna Green in 1853 and Atwood in 1857.

The Pierceton Historic District is a collection of brick, one- and two-story buildings that stretch along both sides of First Street from the railroad tracks, one and one half blocks south to Catholic Street. Freestanding buildings such as the old Depot and the Carnegie Library, are found at the north and south ends of the district. However, the majority of the buildings form a consistent façade along the one hundred block of North First Street. The street grid has a regular north–south pattern with the exception of East Market Street. An 1895 fire left the west side of North First Street south of Market leveled, therefore those buildings all date from after that time.

== Significant buildings ==
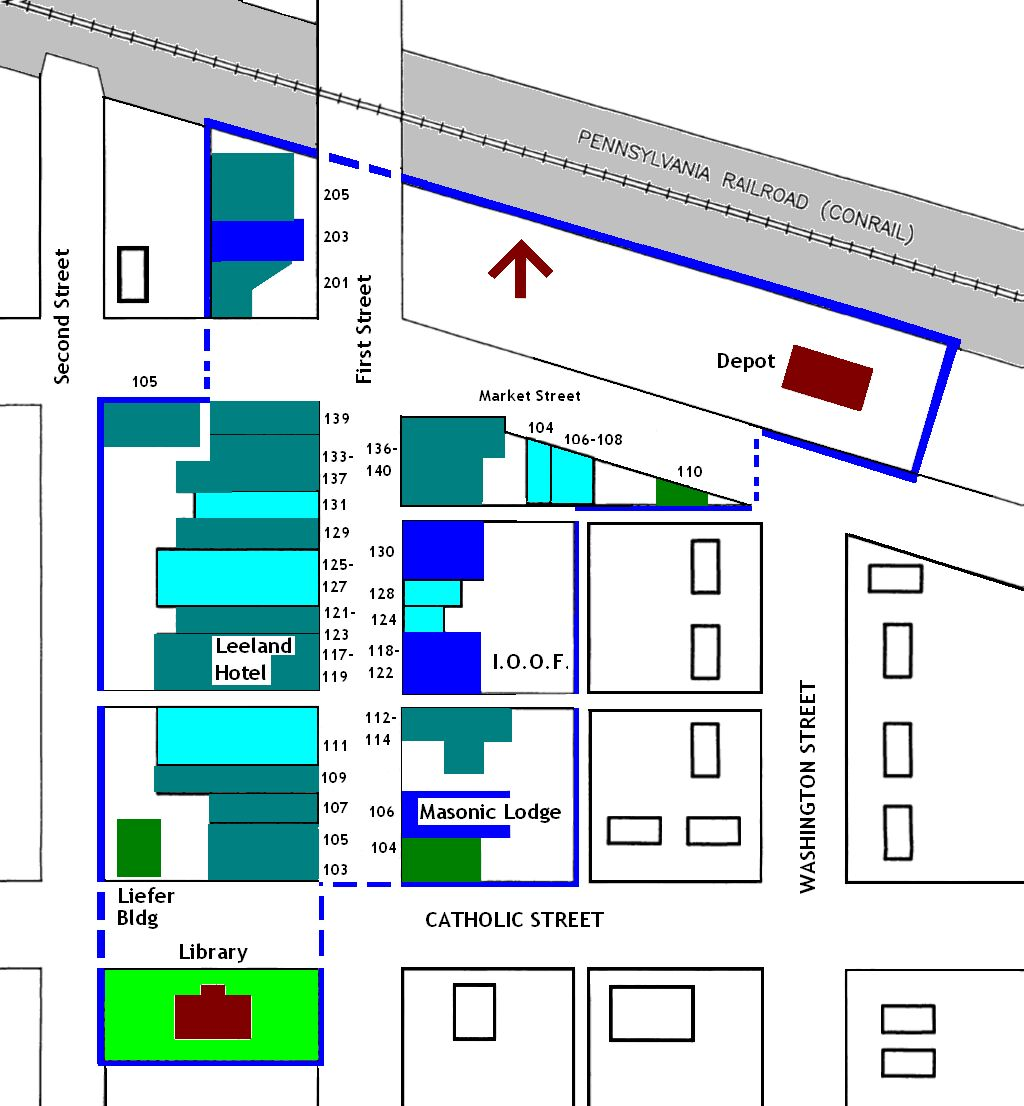
Pierceton Historic District, Indiana, Based on the map in the nomination form.

All structures are historically contributing towards the Historic District Status, unless otherwise noted. An ‘O’ rating signifies that the structure had enough historic or architectural significance to be considered for individual listing in the National Register of Historic Places. The ‘N’ rating signifies that the structure is above average and may, with further investigation be eligible for an individual listing. The ‘C’ or contributing rating signifies that the structure meet the basic inventory qualifications, but fails to meet individual merit, but in combination with other closely placed similar structures warrants inclusion in a historic district.

East Market Street

- Pennsylvania Railroad Depot; Italianate, 1867 (O) The depot has a rectangular plan with its long axis parallel to the tracks. A raised stone foundation is visible around the perimeter of the building. The 1 1/2-story building has a gabled, slate roof with wide overhangs supported by large brackets that rest on pilasters. The gable ends are distinguished with a decorative brickwork entablature and a group of three round-arched window openings at the upper level. Flat-arched window and door openings are scattered around the first floor, with a cargo openings on the north and south sides. The interior retains the original with wood flooring and exposed wood rafters.

West Market Street

- Commercial Building; Twentieth Century Functional, c.1920 (C)

East Market Street

- 102- Commercial Building; Twentieth Century Functional, c.1950 (NC)
- 110- Flat Iron Hotel; Italianate, c.1880 (C) Across from the Depot is the former Flat Iron Hotel. Contemporary to the Depot, it is the oldest surviving commercial building in the district. Three large, round-arched openings remain on the first floor main or north facade and are reminiscent of the days when the building housed the town's post office, an office, and other commercial uses. The main facade is enhanced by ornate brickwork on the cornice. Detailed brick pavers form the sidewalk in front of the building.

West Catholic Street

- 106- Liefer Building; Twentieth Century Functional, 1909 (C) The Leifer Building is a former bakery and marble works shop. It reflects a small commercial and manufacturing facility. A pseudostone façade had been placed on the ground level. The original brick is visible on the upper foors. The name and date are displayed on the cornice.
- Pierceton & Washington Township Carnegie Library; Craftsman, 1916–1918 (O)
  - The Arts and Crafts style Pierceton Carnegie Library is a one-story on a raised basement with a hipped roof. The library has a concrete foundation, scored brick walls with stone trim, and exposed wood roof rafters. The main entrance is a trimmed in stone with a wood and glass door set with multi-paned sidelights and a transom. The interior retains many original details, such as, dark wood trim, a coffered ceiling, original desks, tables, chairs, and shelving.

North First Street

- 103- Commercial Building; Italianate, c.1890 (C)
- 104- American Legion Post; Twentieth Century Functional, c.1940 (C)
  - The American Legion Post was a 1920s addition to a, circa 1910 automobile garage. Its glazed concrete block facade is characteristic.
- 106- Pierceton Masonic Lodge; Neoclassical, c.1930 (Frank Logan, architect) (N)
  - The Pierceton Masonic Lodge was completed after World War II. It was built from brick pavers taken from First Street, with a limestone a Neoclassical facade. The symmetrical facade has a central round-arched with wood and glass door, sidelights and transoms, and two window openings. A cast iron light stanchion flanks each side of the main door. The interior has a barrel vaulted meeting room.
- 118- Pierceton I.O.O.F. Building; Italianate, 122 c.1915 (N) The former Odd fellows Building has a largely intact, cast iron storefront. The lodge room is on the second floor. The room has much of its original detail including pressed metal ceiling and cove molding in a floral pattern, wood flooring, a wood speakers' platform, and anterooms.
- 128- Commercial Building; Contemporary, c.1950 (C)
- 130- Commercial Building; Italianate, c.1890 (N) The building has ornate, pressed metal window hoods over the second floor, flat-arched windows and retains all the elements of its cast iron storefront. The building once had finials and pediments on top of the cornice, which have since disappeared. The interior has historic counters and shelving in the first floor yard goods store, and a stair and freight elevator at the rear.
- 136- Commercial Building; Italianate, 140 c.1900 (C)

South First Street

- 117–119 Commercial Building; Italianate, 119 c.1900 (C) The Leeland Hotel has an intact floor plan on the second floor.
- 121- Commercial Building; Nineteenth 123 Century Functional, c. 1900 (C)
- 125- Commercial Building; Indeterminate, 127 Indeterminate (NC)
- 129- Commercial Building; Italianate, c. 1900 (C)
- 133- Commercial Building; Twentieth
- 137- Century Functional, c. 1920 (C)
- 139- Commercial Building; Italianate, c. 1900 (C) This building has an intact, cast-iron storefront, flat-arched window openings on the second floor, and original interior wood window trim.
- 201- Commercial Building; Italianate, c. 1890 (C) This building was altered in the 1920s for a gas station. The cornice was applied to the new contour. The original round-arched windows with wood-frame and two-over-two windows are visible the sides and back of the building.
- 203- Record Building; Italianate, 1898 (N) The Record" Building has its name and construction date of "1898" affixed to the brick cornice in raised metal letters. This building also has an intact cast-iron storefront.

== Gallery ==
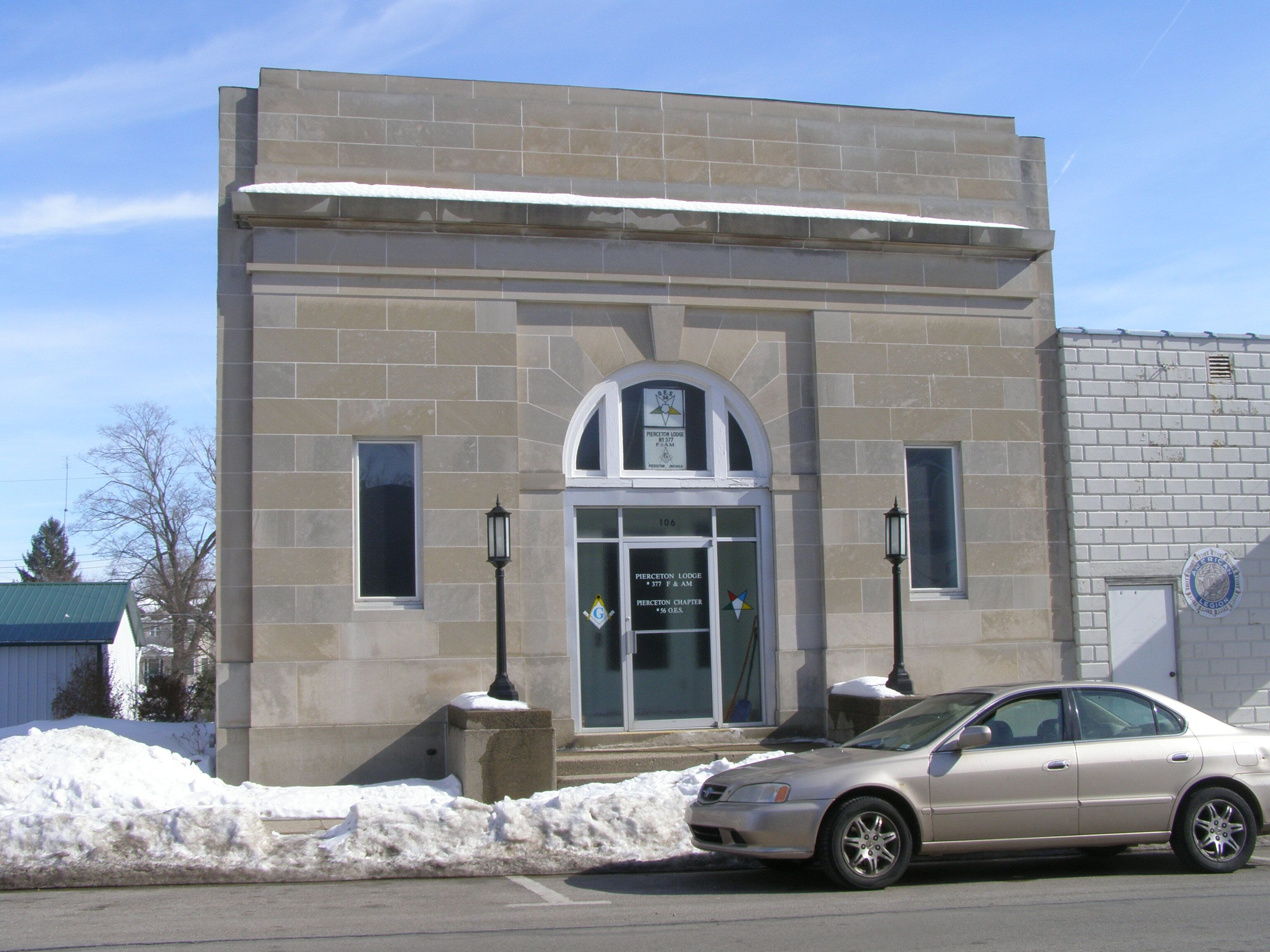
106 N 1st Masonic Lodge, Pierceton, Indiana

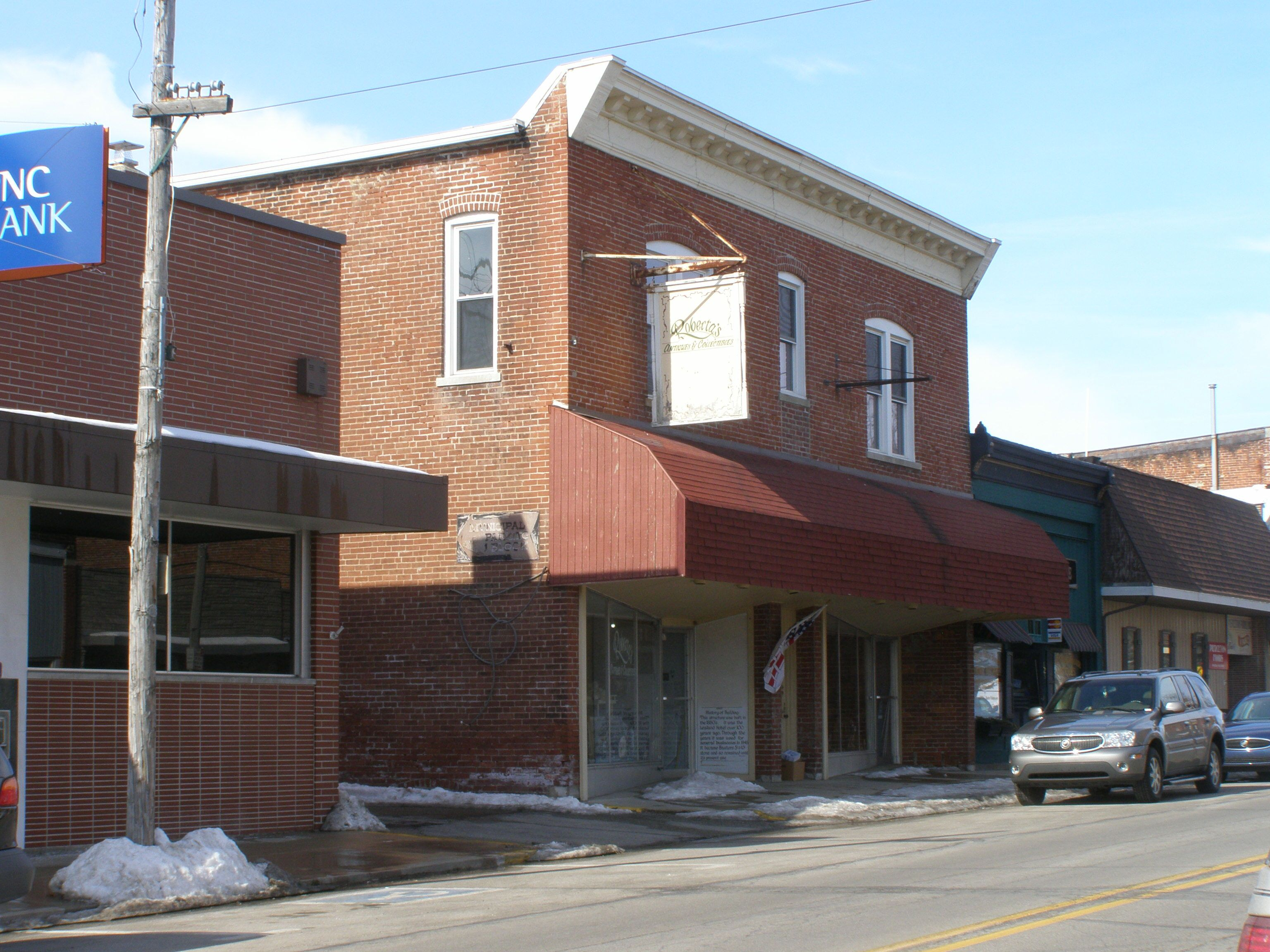
117-119 First Street Leeland Hotel, Pierceton, Indiana

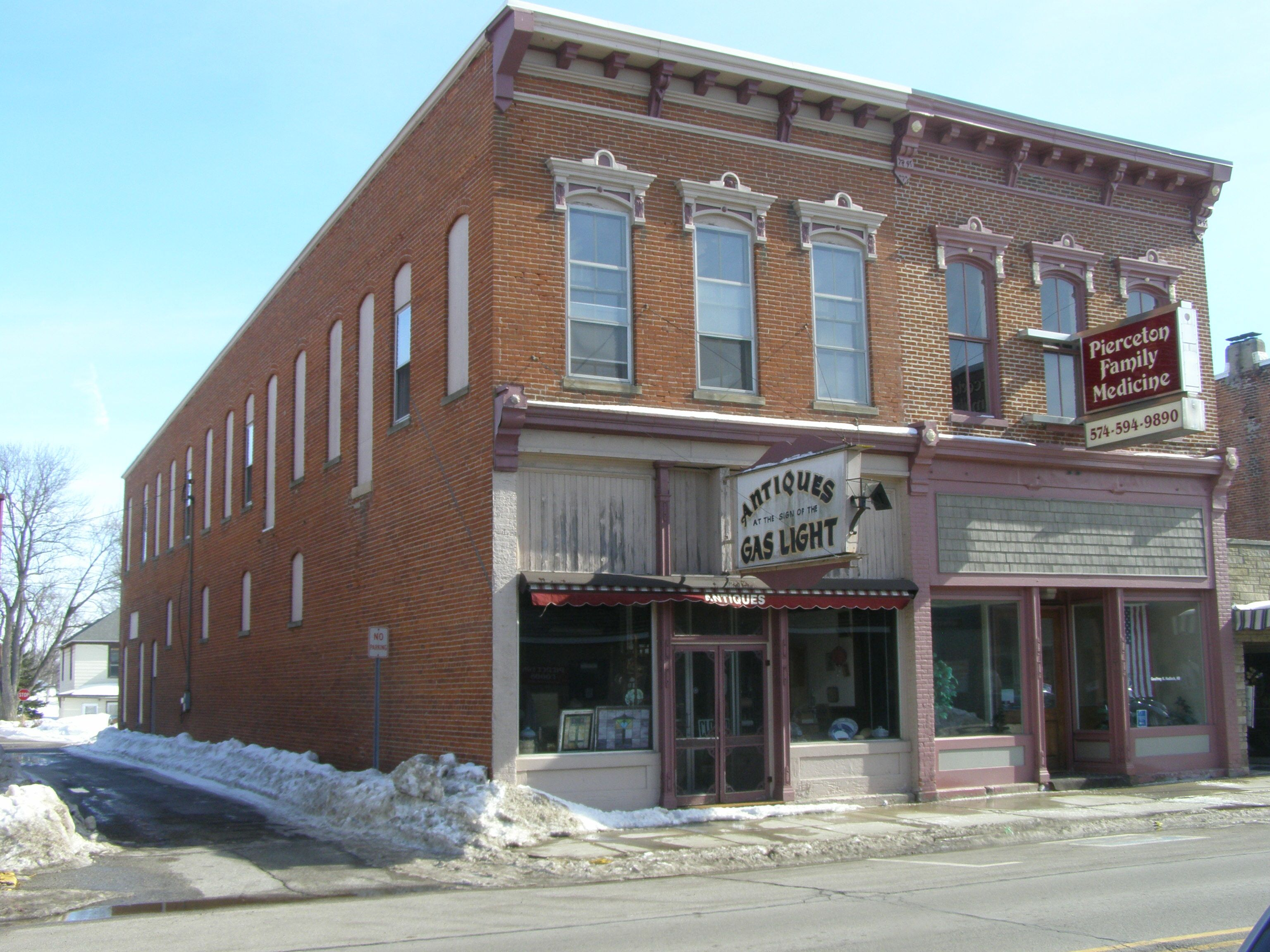
130 First Street, Pierceton, Indiana

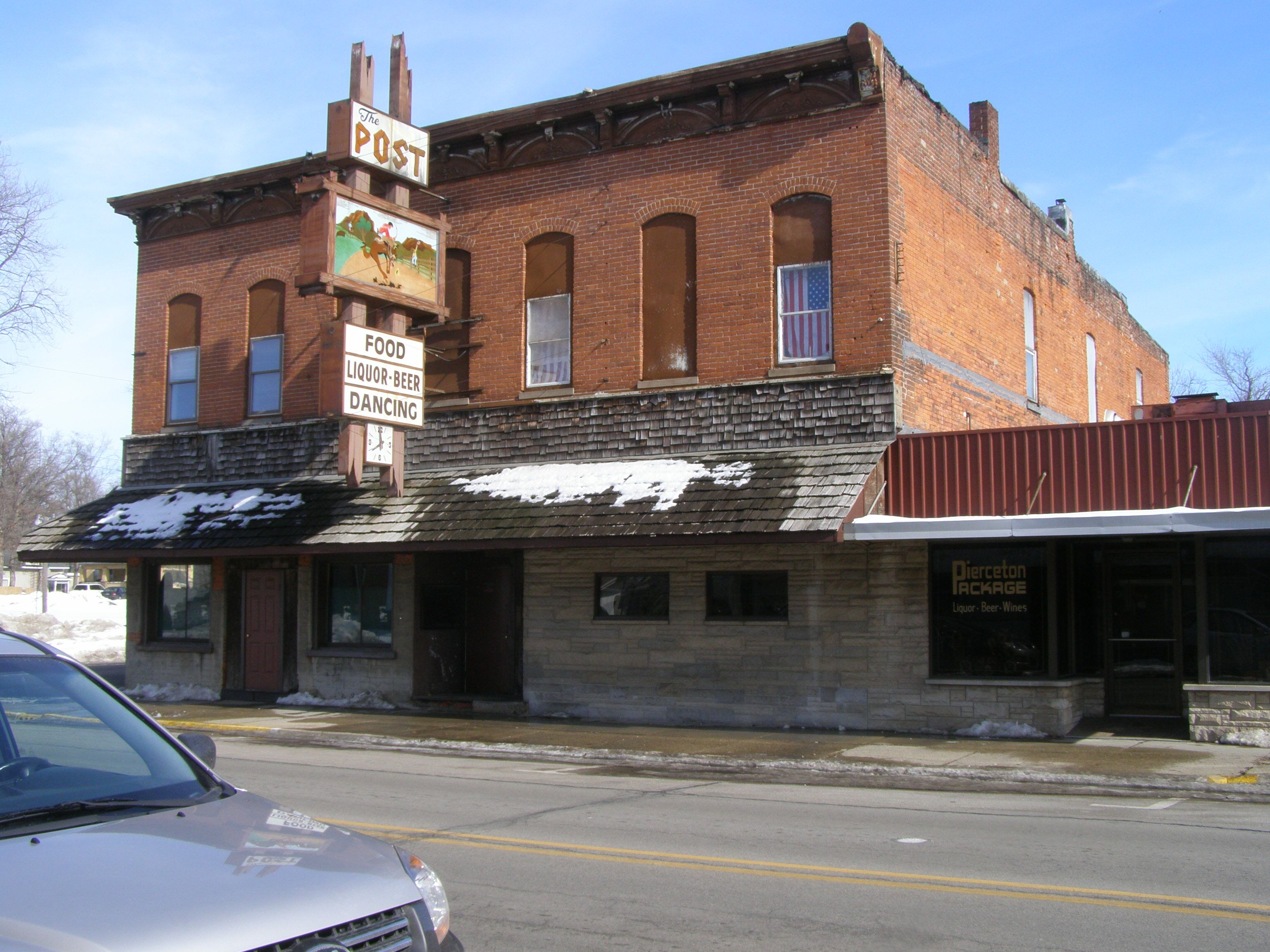
136-140 First Street, Pierceton, Indiana

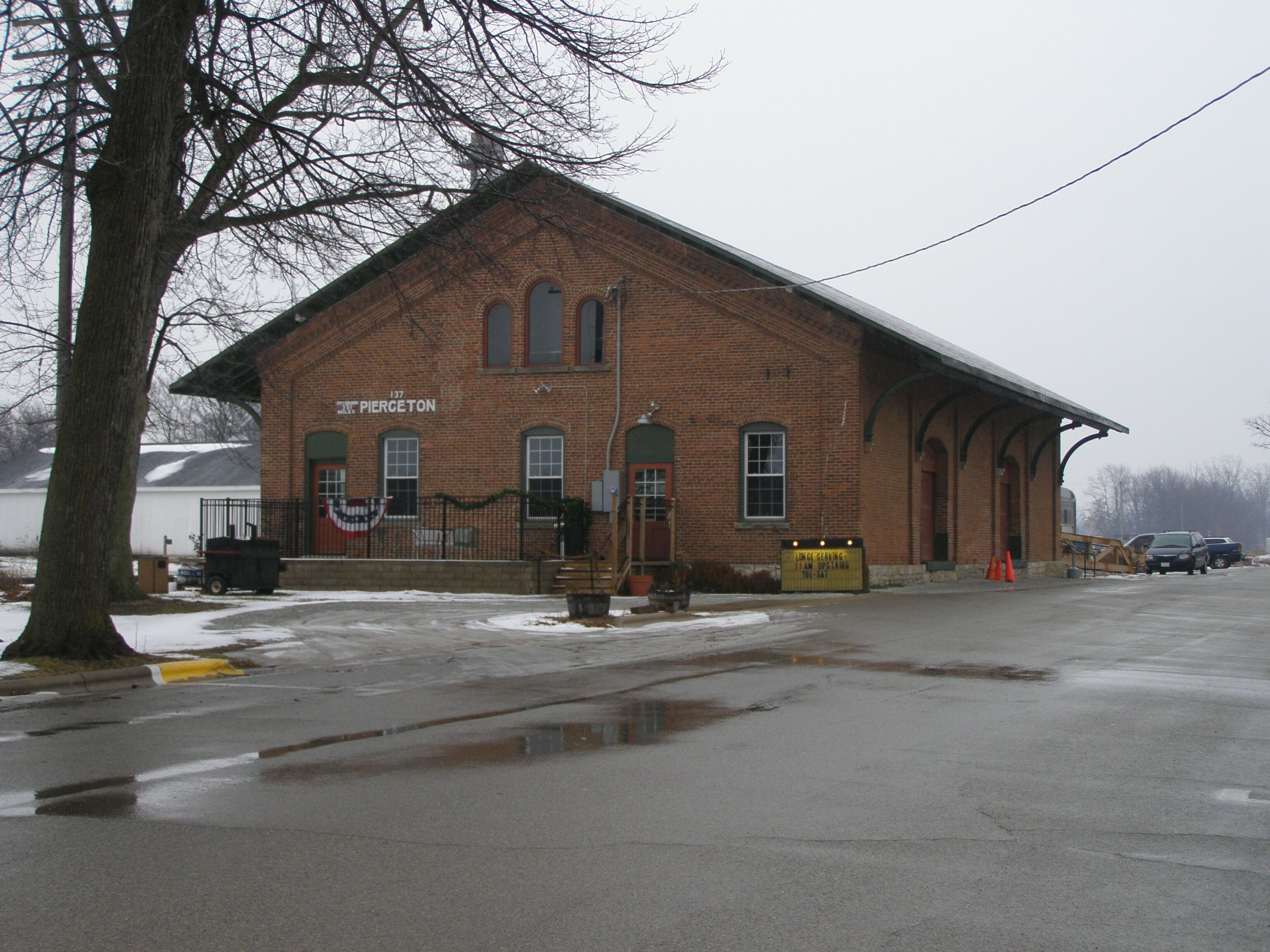
Old Pennsylvania Depot, Pierceton, Indiana

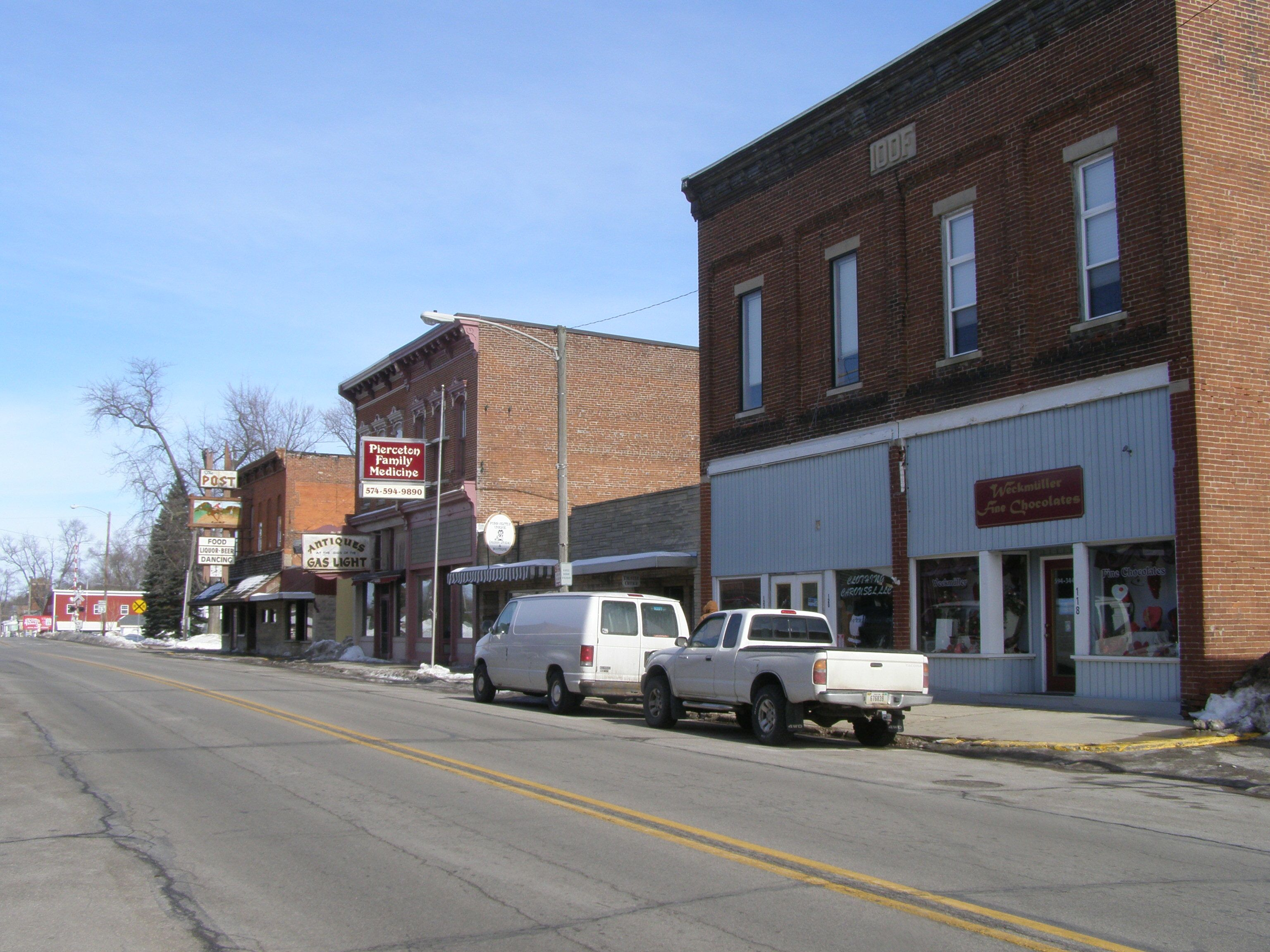
First Street (IOOF), Pierceton, Indiana

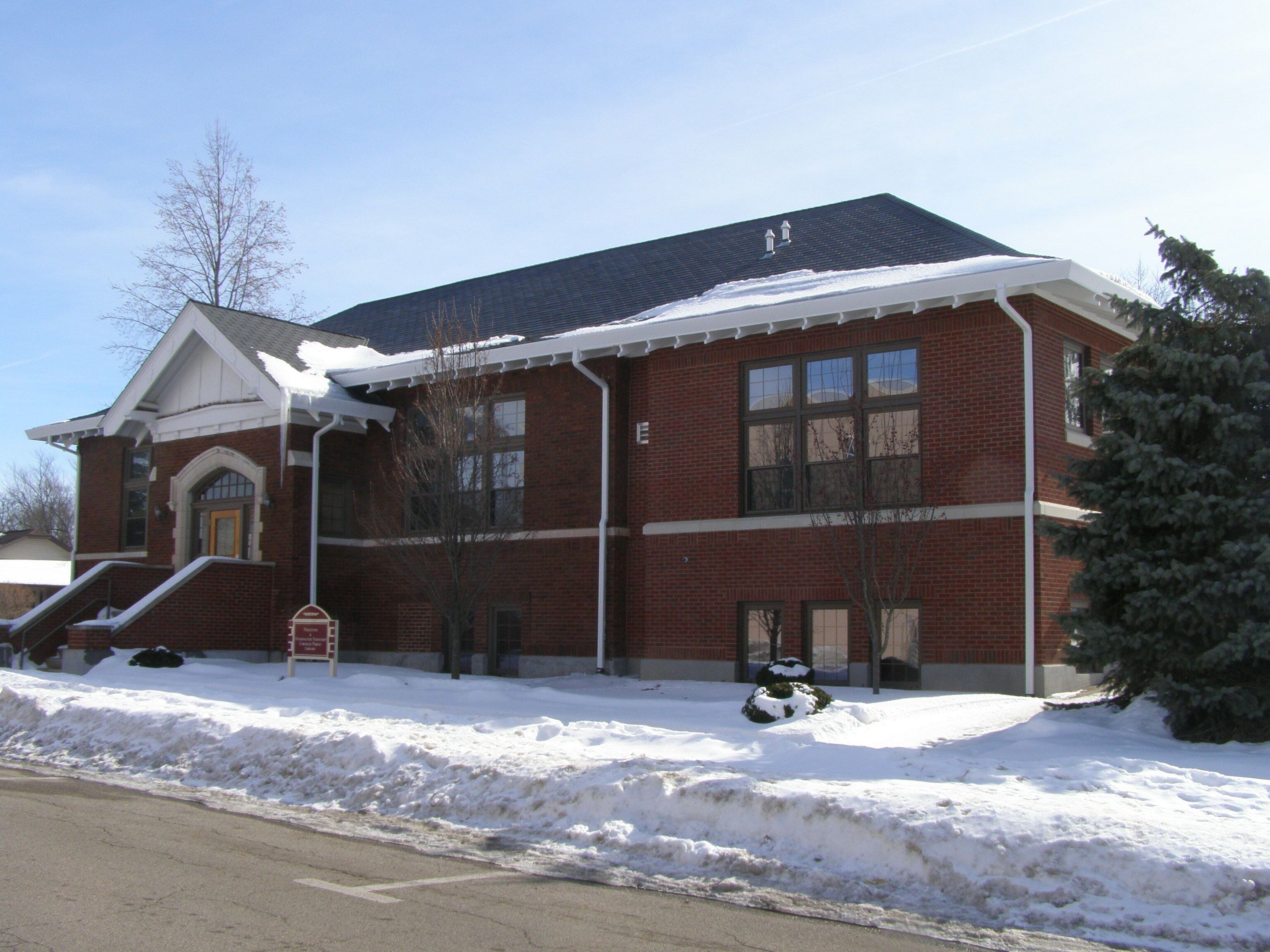
P& Washington Twnshp Carnegie Library, Pierceton, Indiana

== See also ==
- Chinworth Bridge
- Kosciusko County Jail
- Warsaw Courthouse Square Historic District
- Winona Lake Historic District

== Bibliography ==
- Biographical & Historical Record of Kosciusko County, Indiana. Chicago: The Lewis Publishing Company, 1887.
- Combination Atlas Map of Kosciusko County, Indiana. Chicago: Kingman Brothers, 1879.
- Indiana Historic Sites and Structures Inventory: Kosciusko County Interim Report. Indianapolis: Historic Landmarks Foundation of Indiana, March 1991.
- Nye, Charles F. Miscellaneous Articles on the History of Warsaw – Kosciusko County, Indiana. 1945.
- Standard Atlas of Kosciusko County, Indiana. Chicago: George A. Ogle & Company, 1914.
