= Justin Zimmer House =

Historic house in Indiana, United States

- U.S. National Register of Historic Places
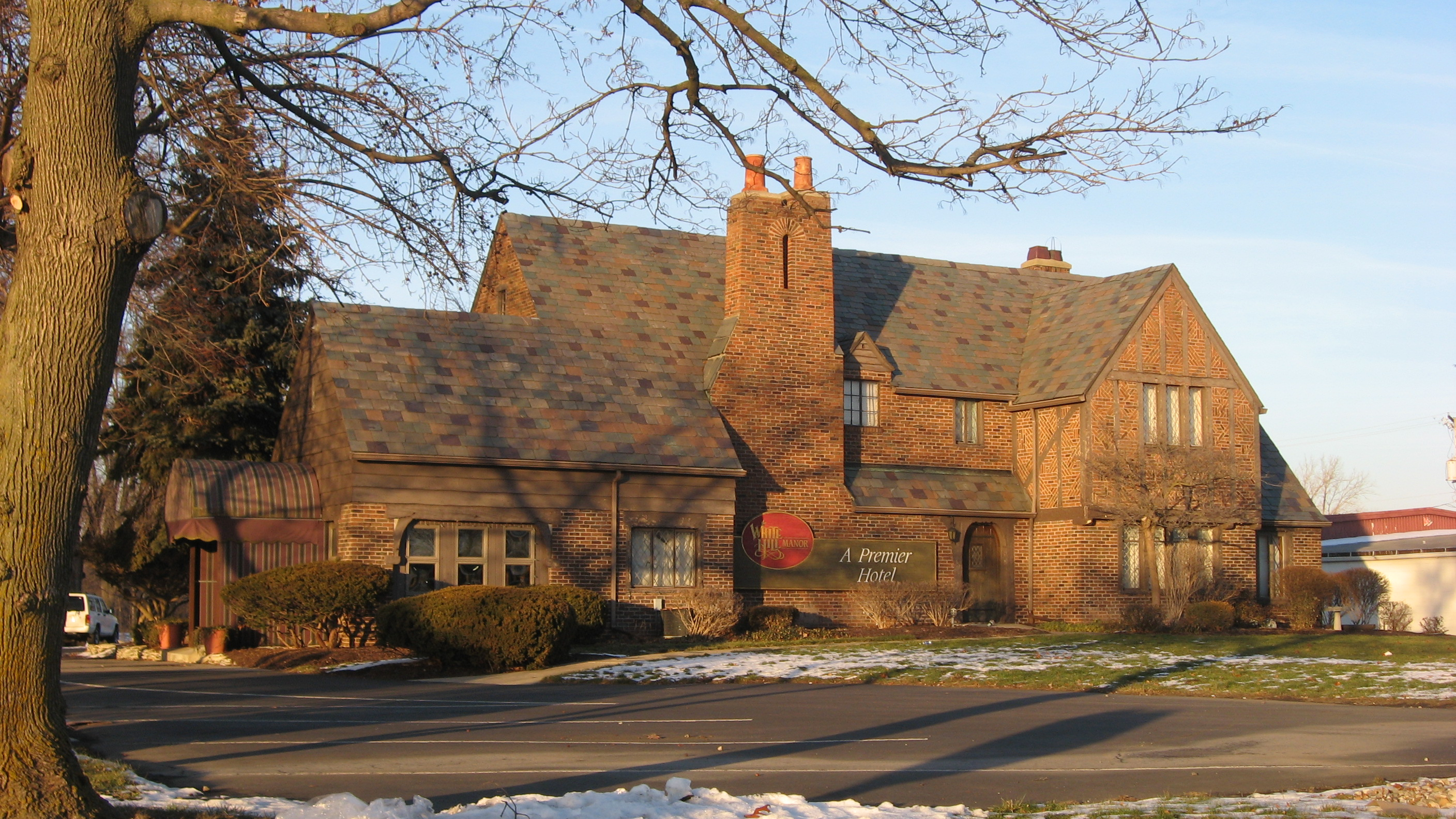

- Location within Indiana Location within the United States
- Location: 2513 E. Center St., Warsaw, Indiana
- Coordinates: 41°14′18″N 85°49′18″W
- Area: less than one acre
- Built: 1934
- Architect: Strauss, Alvin
- Architectural style: Tudor Revival
- NRHP reference No.: 91001865
- Added to NRHP: December 19, 1991

The Justin Zimmer House is a residence in Warsaw, Indiana at 2513 East Center Street. The home was designed by Alvin M. Strauss and built in 1934. It was home to the founder of Zimmer Holdings Justin O. Zimmer (1884–1951) and is one of two Tudor Revival architecture houses in the city. It is now the White Hill Manor bed and breakfast.

It was added to the National Register of Historic Places on December 19, 1991.

== See also ==
- National Register of Historic Places listings in Kosciusko County, Indiana
