= Pierceton, Indiana =

- Town
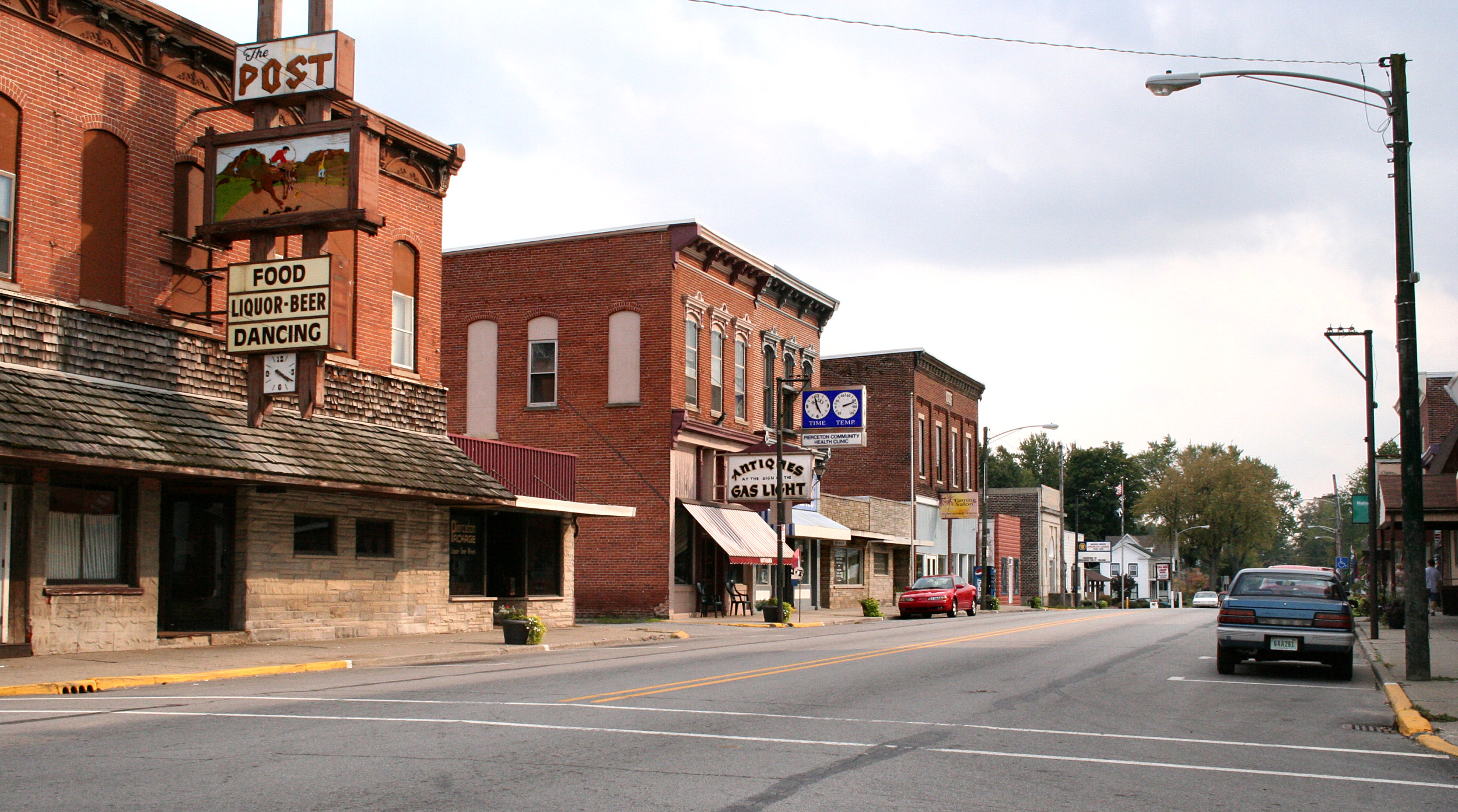
- Pierceton downtown.

- Logo
- Nickname: "The Antique town"
- Location of Pierceton in Kosciusko County, Indiana.
- Coordinates: 41°11′57″N 85°42′12″W
- Country: United States
- State: Indiana
- County: Kosciusko
- Township: Washington
- Established: 1853
- Incorporated: 1866

Area
  - Total: 1.25 sq mi (3.23 km^{2})
  - Land: 1.25 sq mi (3.23 km^{2})
  - Water: 0 sq mi (0.00 km^{2})
- Elevation: 919 ft (280 m)

Population (2020)
  - Total: 928
  - Density: 744.3/sq mi (287.37/km^{2})
- Time zone: UTC-5 (Eastern (EST))
  - Summer (DST): UTC-4 (EDT)
- ZIP code: 46562
- Area code: 574
- FIPS code: 18-59598
- GNIS feature ID: 2396856
- Website: www.in.gov/towns/pierceton/

Pierceton is a town in Washington Township, Kosciusko County, in the U.S. state of Indiana. The population was 928 at the 2020 census.

== History ==
In 1853, John Butler Chapman and Lewis Keith, his father-in-law, employed Otho Means, a surveyor, to lay out Pierceton as it is located today, christened in honor of President Franklin Pierce. The Pierceton post office was established in 1853.

Pierceton was incorporated as a town in 1866.

The Pierceton Historic District was listed on the National Register of Historic Places in 1992.

== Geography ==
Pierceton lies at the intersection of US 30 and State Road 13.

According to the 2010 census, Pierceton has a total area of 1.2 square miles (3.11 km^{2}), all land.

== Demographics ==
Historical population
Census	Pop.	Note	%±
1860	293		—
1870	1,063		262.8%
1880	1,084		2.0%
1890	897		−17.3%
1900	886		−1.2%
1910	817		−7.8%
1920	1,018		24.6%
1930	878		−13.8%
1940	895		1.9%
1950	973		8.7%
1960	1,186		21.9%
1970	1,175		−0.9%
1980	1,086		−7.6%
1990	1,030		−5.2%
2000	695		−32.5%
2010	1,015		46.0%
2020	928		−8.6%
U.S. Decennial Census

=== 2010 census ===
As of the census of 2010, there were 1,015 people, 397 households, and 271 families living in the town. The population density was 845.8 inhabitants per square mile (326.6/km^{2}). There were 432 housing units at an average density of 360.0 per square mile (139.0/km^{2}). The racial makeup of the town was 96.8% White, 0.3% Native American, 0.2% Asian, 1.3% from other races, and 1.4% from two or more races. Hispanic or Latino of any race were 6.1% of the population.

There were 397 households, of which 35.3% had children under the age of 18 living with them, 48.9% were married couples living together, 12.8% had a female householder with no husband present, 6.5% had a male householder with no wife present, and 31.7% were non-families. 28.2% of all households were made up of individuals, and 13.4% had someone living alone who was 65 years of age or older. The average household size was 2.56 and the average family size was 3.10.

The median age in the town was 35.7 years. 28.5% of residents were under the age of 18; 7% were between the ages of 18 and 24; 27.4% were from 25 to 44; 23.9% were from 45 to 64; and 13.2% were 65 years of age or older. The gender makeup of the town was 47.9% male and 52.1% female.

=== 2000 census ===
As of the census of 2000, there were 695 people, 260 households, and 187 families living in the town. The population density was 759.3 inhabitants per square mile (293.2/km^{2}). There were 272 housing units at an average density of 297.2 per square mile (114.7/km^{2}). The racial makeup of the town was 94.68% White, 1.15% African American, 0.14% Native American, 0.29% Asian, 0.14% Pacific Islander, 2.45% from other races, and 1.15% from two or more races. Hispanic or Latino of any race were 5.47% of the population.

There were 260 households, out of which 37.7% had children under the age of 18 living with them, 51.5% were married couples living together, 15.8% had a female householder with no husband present, and 27.7% were non-families. 24.6% of all households were made up of individuals, and 10.8% had someone living alone who was 65 years of age or older. The average household size was 2.67 and the average family size was 3.16.

In the town, the population was spread out, with 31.9% under the age of 18, 6.0% from 18 to 24, 29.4% from 25 to 44, 22.4% from 45 to 64, and 10.2% who were 65 years of age or older. The median age was 34 years. For every 100 females, there were 95.8 males. For every 100 females age 18 and over, there were 87.7 males.

The median income for a household in the town was $37,188, and the median income for a family was $42,361. Males had a median income of $30,682 versus $22,000 for females. The per capita income for the town was $14,436. About 9.4% of families and 11.9% of the population were below the poverty line, including 15.3% of those under age 18 and 11.8% of those age 65 or over.

== Education ==
The town has a lending library, the Pierceton & Washington Township Public Library.
