= Chinworth Bridge =

Historic Pratt through-truss bridge in Indiana

- U.S. National Register of Historic Places
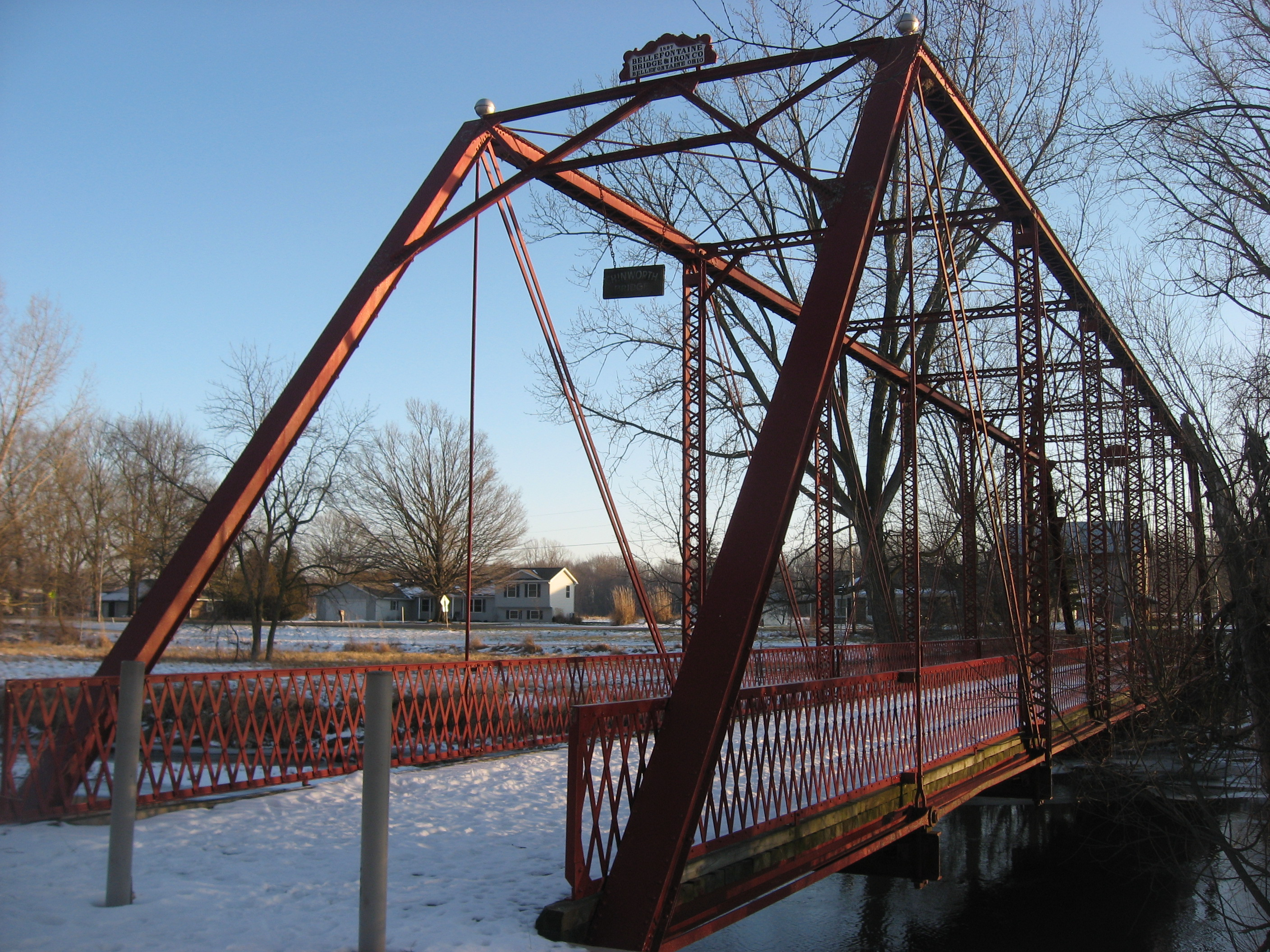
- Northern portal and western (downstream) side of the Chinworth Bridge, which spans the Tippecanoe River west of Warsaw in Harrison and Wayne Townships of Kosciusko County, Indiana, United States.

- Location within Indiana Location within the United States
- Nearest city: Junction of Old U.S. Route 30 and Road 350 W west of Warsaw, across the Tippecanoe River, Harrison Township and Wayne Township, Kosciusko County, Indiana
- Coordinates: 41°14′49″N 85°54′38″W
- Area: less than one acre
- Built: 1897
- Built by: Bellefontaine Bridge & Iron Company
- Architectural style: Pratt through truss
- NRHP reference No.: 96001546
- Added to NRHP: January 2, 1997

The Chinworth Bridge is a bridge in Kosciusko County, Indiana. It is the only surviving Pratt through-truss bridge in the county and is one of the only remaining bridges constructed by the Bellefontaine Bridge and Iron Company.

Just west of the bridge was a ford across the Tippecanoe River. The Yellowstone Trail passed on the south side of the river. A marker has been maintained at this location consisting of a post with yellows bands and a "Y" in a black circle. In 1884, a new bridge across the Tippecanoe River was requested to connect Warsaw, on the south with Atwood and Etna Green on the north. It crossed the property of Robert Chinworth. Capt. David Braden working for the Bellefontaine Bridge and Iron Company agreed to erect a 140 feet (43 m) span over the Tippecanoe River, at a total cost of $2520.00. The bridge opened in August, 1897. In 1924, with the construction of U.S. 30 the Chinworth Bridge was bypassed as it could not handle modern vehicular traffic. The Indiana State Highway Commission, created Tippecanoe Rest Area adjacent to the Chinworth Bridge.

In 1975, the enhanced 4-lane U.S. 30 was located north of the Chinworth Bridge. The bridge was closed to all vehicular traffic at that time. In July the Kosciusko County Historical Society obtained the Tippecanoe Rest Park from the State Highway Department. The KCHS dedicated the bridge as a historic landmark on July 6, 1975.

== Description ==
The Chinworth Bridge was built by the Bellefontaine Bridge and Iron Company of Bellefontaine, Ohio. It is a 140 feet (43 m) Pratt through-truss. The trusses have eight panels, each 17.5 feet (5.3 m) long, set on abutments of cut stone. The southern abutment has been altered over the years.

The trusses have horizontal and parallel top and bottom chords, 24 feet (7.3 m) apart with inclined posts at each end. Diagonals are designed for tension with greater stress expected toward the span's end. A single counterbrace in the third panel and a pair in the fourth, each of 0.75 inches (1.9 cm) round rods with turnbuckles.

Bracing at the upper chord and at the lower chord adds strength. To protect against swaying, a round iron rod runs diagonally from one truss to the other.

I-floor beams carry the span's deck. Sets of stringers carry the 14 feet (4.3 m) timber running surface. The timbers were covered in 1927 by a bituminous coating. A latticed guardrail runs the length of each side of the deck. The bridge allows a clearance of 19 feet (5.8 m).

== Significance ==
Chinworth Bridge is an example of a Pratt through-truss bridge. Patented in 1844 Caleb and Thomas Pratt, the truss has vertical elements acting in compression and diagonal components acting in tension. A pin-connected Pratt through truss is "representative of perhaps the most common type of early-20th century truss bridges."

== Bibliography ==
- Comp, T. Allan and Donald Jackson. "Bridge Truss Types: a guide to dating and identifying."
- American Association for State and Local History Technical Leaflet 95, History News. Vol 32, No. 5, May, 1977.
- Cooper, James L. Iron Monuments to Distant Posterity: Indiana's Metal Bridges. 1870–1950. Indianapolis: Technical Publishing Services, 1987.
- Cooper, James L. "Orion and the Chinworth Bridge." 1996.
- Jackson, Donald C. "Great American Bridges and Dams." A National Trust Guide, Great American Places Series, The Preservation Press.
- Preservation Information. Preserving Historic Bridges. National Trust for Historic Preservation.
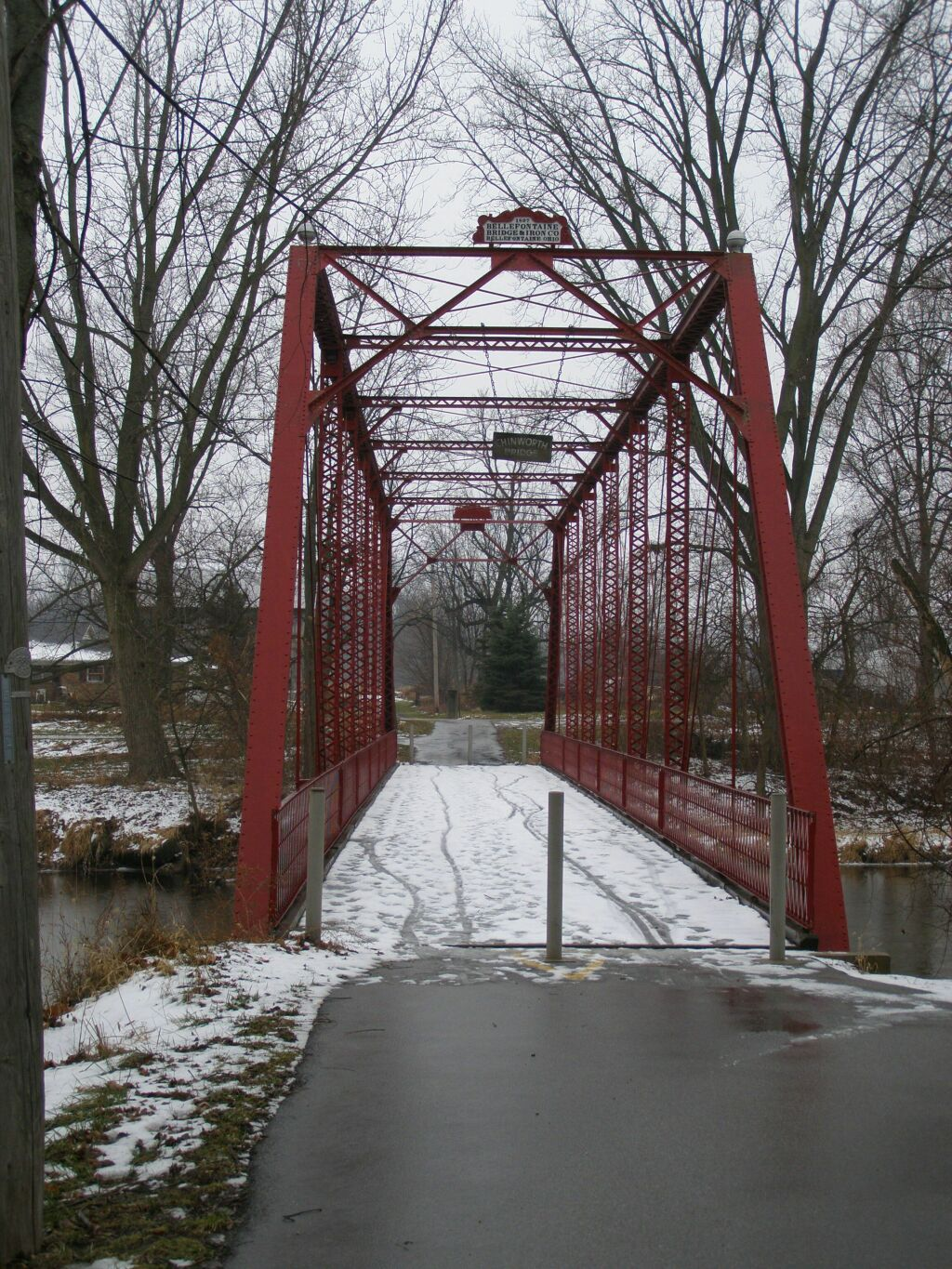
The only Pratt through truss bridge remaining in Kosciusko County. One of the few surviving spans built by the Bellefontaine Bridge and Iron Company.

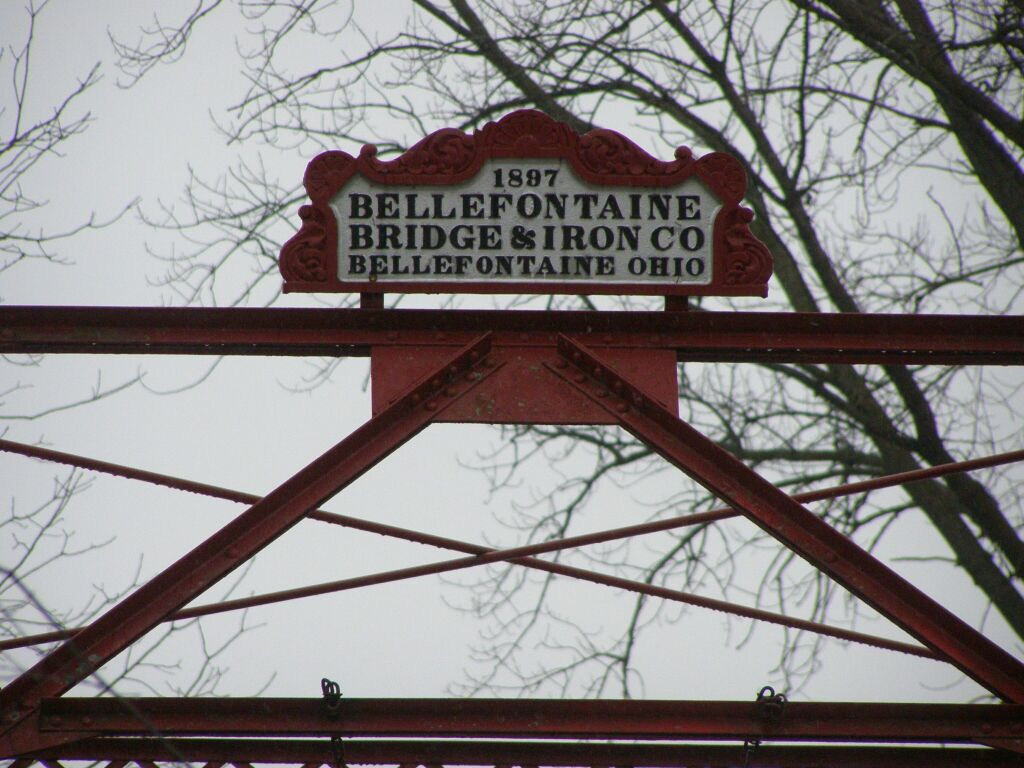
A surviving spans built by the Bellefontaine Bridge and Iron Company.

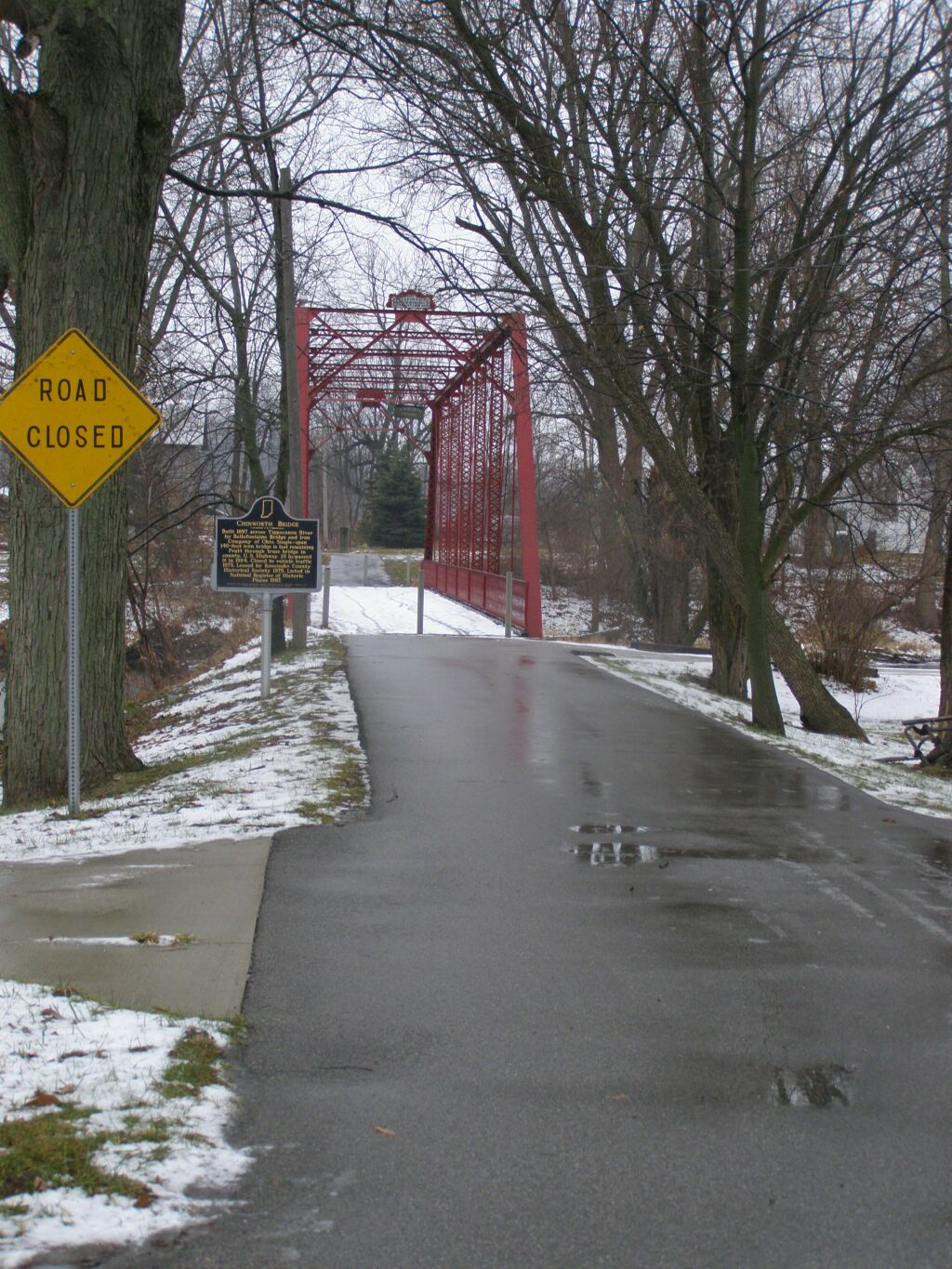
A Pratt through truss bridge in Kosciusko County.

== See also ==
- Kosciusko County Jail
- Warsaw Courthouse Square Historic District
- Winona Lake Historic District
