= East Fort Wayne Street Historic District =

Historic district in Indiana, United States

- U.S. National Register of Historic Places
- U.S. Historic district
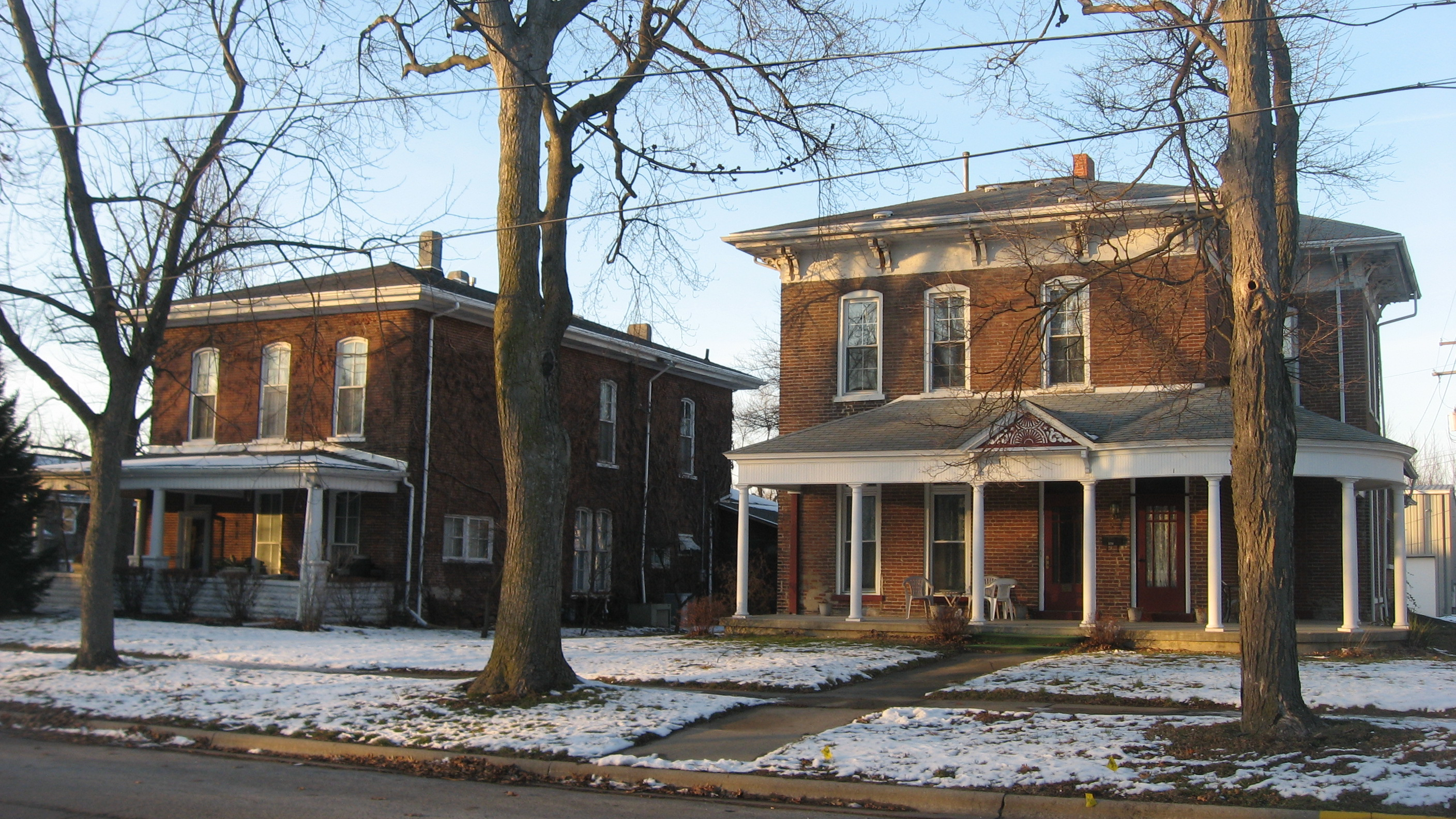
- East Fort Wayne Street Historic District, January 2013

- Location within Indiana Location within the United States
- Location: 503-613 E. Fort Wayne St., Warsaw, Indiana
- Coordinates: 41°14′25″N 85°51′01″W
- Area: 2.7 acres (1.1 ha)
- Architectural style: Bungalow/craftsman, Italianate, Queen Anne
- NRHP reference No.: 93000472
- Added to NRHP: May 27, 1993

East Fort Wayne Street Historic District is a national historic district located at Warsaw, Indiana. The district encompasses 14 contributing buildings in an exclusively residential section of Warsaw. It developed between about 1860 and 1920, and includes notable examples of Italianate, Queen Anne, and Bungalow / American Craftsman style architecture. Notable buildings include the Hudson Beck House (1874), Samuel Chipman House (1860), and Meyers House (1917).

It was listed on the National Register of Historic Places in 1993.
