= Wayne Township, Kosciusko County, Indiana =

Wayne Township
- Township
- Coordinates: 41°13′10″N 85°50′16″W
- Country: United States
- State: Indiana
- County: Kosciusko

Government
  - Type: Indiana township

Area
  - Total: 45.06 sq mi (116.7 km^{2})
  - Land: 42.73 sq mi (110.7 km^{2})
  - Water: 2.33 sq mi (6.0 km^{2})
- Elevation: 830 ft (253 m)

Population (2020)
  - Total: 29,110
  - Density: 644.7/sq mi (248.9/km^{2})
- Time zone: UTC-5 (Eastern (EST))
  - Summer (DST): UTC-4 (EDT)
- FIPS code: 18-81782
- GNIS feature ID: 454034

Wayne Township is one of seventeen townships in Kosciusko County, Indiana. As of the 2020 census, its population was 29,110 (up from 27,551 at 2010) and it contained 12,127 housing units.

Wayne Township was organized in 1836.

== Geography ==
According to the 2010 census, the township has a total area of 45.06 square miles (116.7 km^{2}), of which 42.73 square miles (110.7 km^{2}) (or 94.83%) is land and 2.33 square miles (6.0 km^{2}) (or 5.17%) is water.

=== Cities and towns ===
- Warsaw
- Winona Lake

=== Unincorporated towns ===
- Lakeside Park at 41.2522668°N 85.8491580°W

(This list is based on USGS data and may include former settlements.)

== Education ==
Wayne Township residents may obtain a free library card from the Warsaw Community Public Library in Warsaw.
