= Warsaw, Indiana =

- City
- City of Warsaw
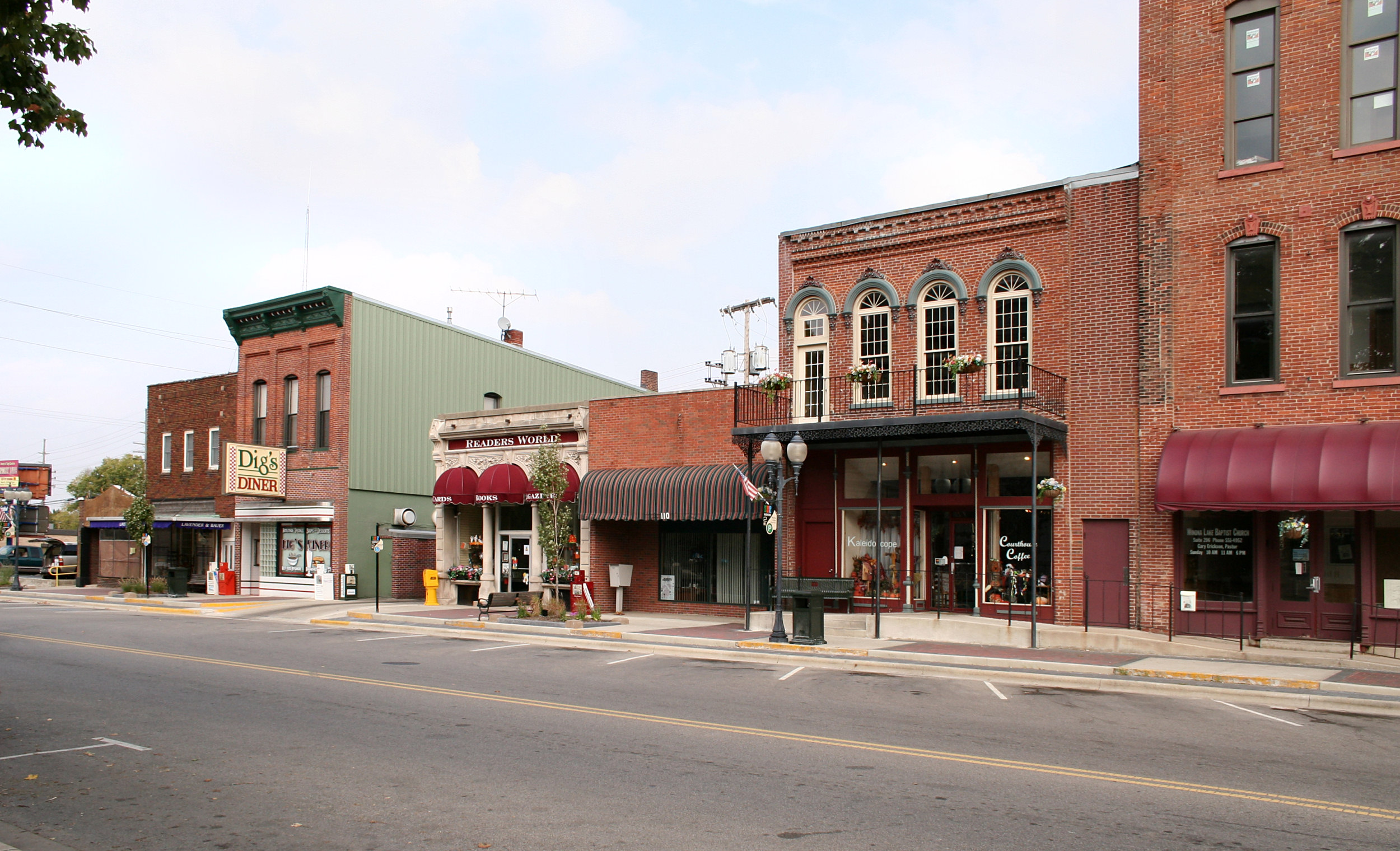
- Downtown Warsaw in October 2005

- Flag
- Nicknames: "Lake City", "Orthopedic Capital of the World"
- Location of Warsaw in Kosciusko County, Indiana.
- Coordinates: 41°15′26″N 85°50′49″W
- Country: United States
- State: Indiana
- County: Kosciusko
- Townships: Plain and Wayne

Government
  - Mayor: Jeff Grose (R)

Area
  - Total: 14.76 sq mi (38.22 km^{2})
  - Land: 13.40 sq mi (34.70 km^{2})
  - Water: 1.36 sq mi (3.52 km^{2})
- Elevation: 810 ft (250 m)

Population (2020)
  - Total: 15,804
  - Estimate (2022): 16,111
  - Density: 1,179.6/sq mi (455.44/km^{2})
- Time zone: UTC−05:00 (Eastern (EST))
  - Summer (DST): UTC−04:00 (EDT)
- ZIP Codes: 46580-46582
- Area code: 574
- FIPS code: 18-80306
- GNIS feature ID: 2397199
- Website: warsaw.in.gov

Historical population
Census	Pop.	Note	%±
1850	304		—
1870	2,206		—
1880	3,123		41.6%
1890	3,574		14.4%
1900	3,987		11.6%
1910	4,430		11.1%
1920	5,478		23.7%
1930	5,730		4.6%
1940	6,378		11.3%
1950	6,625		3.9%
1960	7,234		9.2%
1970	7,506		3.8%
1980	10,647		41.8%
1990	10,968		3.0%
2000	12,415		13.2%
2010	13,559		9.2%
2020	15,804		16.6%
Source: US Census Bureau

Warsaw is a city in and the county seat of Kosciusko County, Indiana, United States. Warsaw has a population of 15,804 as of the 2020 U.S. census. Warsaw also borders a smaller town, Winona Lake.

== Etymology ==
Warsaw, named after the capital of Poland in tribute to Tadeusz Kościuszko, was platted on October 21, 1836. Warsaw's post office was established in 1837.

== History ==
Early Warsaw saw traders, trappers, and merchants supplying manufactured goods to area farmers. Because of the central location in the lake region, tourists soon began visiting Warsaw and eventually made permanent residences in the city, with industry soon following.

In March 1854, Warsaw became a town, and the initial census on February 2, 1854, showed a total of 752 residents in the town limits. The Pennsylvania Railroad (then known as the Pittsburgh, Fort Wayne, and Chicago Railroad) reached Warsaw in November 1854. The Big Four Railroad (Cleveland, Cincinnati, Chicago, and St Louis) arrived in Warsaw in August 1870.

Gas lights were installed in August 1880. Telephone lines were strung in 1882, with Dr. Eggleston having the first phone. The waterworks were constructed in 1885. Gas was supplemented with electricity in 1897, but gas was still used in many homes until 1915.

In 1895, Revra DePuy founded DePuy Manufacturing in Warsaw to make wire mesh and wooden splints, becoming the world's first manufacturer of orthopedic appliances. In 1905, DePuy hired Justin Zimmer as a splint salesman. Zimmer broke away from DePuy in 1927 to start his orthopedic company with Joe Ettinger in the basement of Ettinger. Warsaw is now known as the "orthopaedic capital of the world."

The Warsaw-based East Fort Wayne Street Historic District, Kosciusko County Jail, Warsaw Courthouse Square Historic District, Warsaw Cut Glass Company, and Justin Zimmer House are listed on the National Register of Historic Places.

== Geography ==
Warsaw occupies the area between Pike Lake, Hidden Lake and Center Lake (to the north) and Winona Lake (to the southeast). The Tippecanoe River passes through the West portion of Warsaw. U.S. Route 30 and Indiana State Road 15 both pass through town, while Indiana State Road 25 begins on West Market Street while traffic is routed to West Winona Avenue along with State Road 15 after US Route 30 bypassed the downtown area.

According to the 2010 census, Warsaw has a total area of 12.918 square miles (33.46 km^{2}), of which 11.58 square miles (29.99 km^{2}) (or 89.64%) is land and 1.338 square miles (3.47 km^{2}) (or 10.36%) is water.

=== Climate ===
Climate data for Warsaw, Indiana (1991–2020 normals, extremes 1896–1898, 1946–present)
Month	Jan	Feb	Mar	Apr	May	Jun	Jul	Aug	Sep	Oct	Nov	Dec	Year
Record high °F (°C)	69 (21)	73 (23)	85 (29)	100 (38)	98 (37)	104 (40)	111 (44)	106 (41)	103 (39)	92 (33)	85 (29)	69 (21)	111 (44)
Mean maximum °F (°C)	53.5 (11.9)	57.2 (14.0)	69.3 (20.7)	78.7 (25.9)	86.5 (30.3)	91.9 (33.3)	91.4 (33.0)	89.9 (32.2)	88.9 (31.6)	80.9 (27.2)	67.5 (19.7)	56.4 (13.6)	94.0 (34.4)
Mean daily maximum °F (°C)	33.0 (0.6)	36.8 (2.7)	47.9 (8.8)	60.9 (16.1)	71.7 (22.1)	80.8 (27.1)	83.8 (28.8)	81.8 (27.7)	76.2 (24.6)	63.6 (17.6)	49.8 (9.9)	37.7 (3.2)	60.3 (15.7)
Daily mean °F (°C)	24.8 (−4.0)	27.9 (−2.3)	37.7 (3.2)	49.4 (9.7)	60.2 (15.7)	69.5 (20.8)	72.8 (22.7)	70.8 (21.6)	64.3 (17.9)	52.6 (11.4)	40.6 (4.8)	30.0 (−1.1)	50.1 (10.1)
Mean daily minimum °F (°C)	16.6 (−8.6)	18.9 (−7.3)	27.5 (−2.5)	37.9 (3.3)	48.7 (9.3)	58.2 (14.6)	61.7 (16.5)	59.8 (15.4)	52.4 (11.3)	41.6 (5.3)	31.4 (−0.3)	22.3 (−5.4)	39.8 (4.3)
Mean minimum °F (°C)	−3.3 (−19.6)	1.7 (−16.8)	10.4 (−12.0)	23.9 (−4.5)	34.9 (1.6)	44.8 (7.1)	50.0 (10.0)	49.9 (9.9)	39.0 (3.9)	28.4 (−2.0)	18.3 (−7.6)	3.9 (−15.6)	−9.5 (−23.1)
Record low °F (°C)	−25 (−32)	−21 (−29)	−9 (−23)	8 (−13)	24 (−4)	32 (0)	40 (4)	36 (2)	28 (−2)	18 (−8)	−4 (−20)	−23 (−31)	−25 (−32)
Average precipitation inches (mm)	2.59 (66)	1.98 (50)	2.16 (55)	4.05 (103)	4.89 (124)	4.72 (120)	4.41 (112)	4.52 (115)	2.90 (74)	3.17 (81)	2.71 (69)	2.44 (62)	40.54 (1,030)
Average precipitation days (≥ 0.01 in)	11.7	8.2	9.0	12.0	12.6	11.5	9.2	9.2	8.9	10.6	11.0	11.3	125.2
Source: NOAA

== Transportation ==
=== Airport ===
- KASW - Warsaw Municipal Airport

== Demographics ==
=== 2020 census ===
As of the 2020 census, Warsaw had a population of 15,804. The median age was 35.7 years. 23.3% of residents were under the age of 18 and 16.5% of residents were 65 years of age or older. For every 100 females there were 93.9 males, and for every 100 females age 18 and over there were 91.0 males age 18 and over.

97.5% of residents lived in urban areas, while 2.5% lived in rural areas.

There were 6,628 households in Warsaw, of which 29.0% had children under the age of 18 living in them. Of all households, 40.4% were married-couple households, 21.2% were households with a male householder and no spouse or partner present, and 31.4% were households with a female householder and no spouse or partner present. About 34.3% of all households were made up of individuals and 13.4% had someone living alone who was 65 years of age or older.

There were 7,194 housing units, of which 7.9% were vacant. The homeowner vacancy rate was 2.0% and the rental vacancy rate was 9.4%.

Racial composition as of the 2020 census
Race	Number	Percent
White	12,338	78.1%
Black or African American	327	2.1%
American Indian and Alaska Native	79	0.5%
Asian	886	5.6%
Native Hawaiian and Other Pacific Islander	7	0.0%
Some other race	901	5.7%
Two or more races	1,266	8.0%
Hispanic or Latino (of any race)	2,058	13.0%

=== 2010 census ===
As of the 2010 U.S. census, there were 13,559 people, 5,461 households, and 3,311 families living in the city. The population density was 1,170.9 inhabitants per square mile (452.1/km^{2}). There were 6,066 housing units at an average density of 523.8 per square mile (202.2/km^{2}). The racial makeup of the city was 89.5% White, 1.6% African American, 0.5% Native American, 2.2% Asian, 4.3% from other races, and 2.0% from two or more races. Hispanic or Latino of any race were 10.4% of the population.

There were 5,461 households, of which 32.1% had children under the age of 18 living with them, 43.1% were married couples living together, 12.8% had a female householder with no husband present, 4.7% had a male householder with no wife present, and 39.4% were non-families. 32.8% of all households were made up of individuals, and 11.7% had someone living alone who was 65 years of age or older. The average household size was 2.38 and the average family size was 3.02.

The median age in the city was 34.8 years. 25.2% of residents were under the age of 18; 9.2% were between the ages of 18 and 24; 28.2% were from 25 to 44; 24% were from 45 to 64; and 13.4% were 65 years of age or older. The gender makeup of the city was 49.1% male and 50.9% female.

=== 2000 census ===
As of the 2000 U.S. census, there were 12,415 people, 4,794 households, and 3,068 families living in the city. The population density was 1,184.6 inhabitants per square mile (457.4/km^{2}). There were 5,101 housing units at an average density of 486.7 per square mile (187.9/km^{2}). The racial makeup of the city was 70.50% White, 1.41% African American, 0.39% Native American, 1.07% Asian, 0.02% Pacific Islander, 5.25% from other races, and 1.37% from two or more races. Hispanic or Latino of any race were 29.21% of the population.

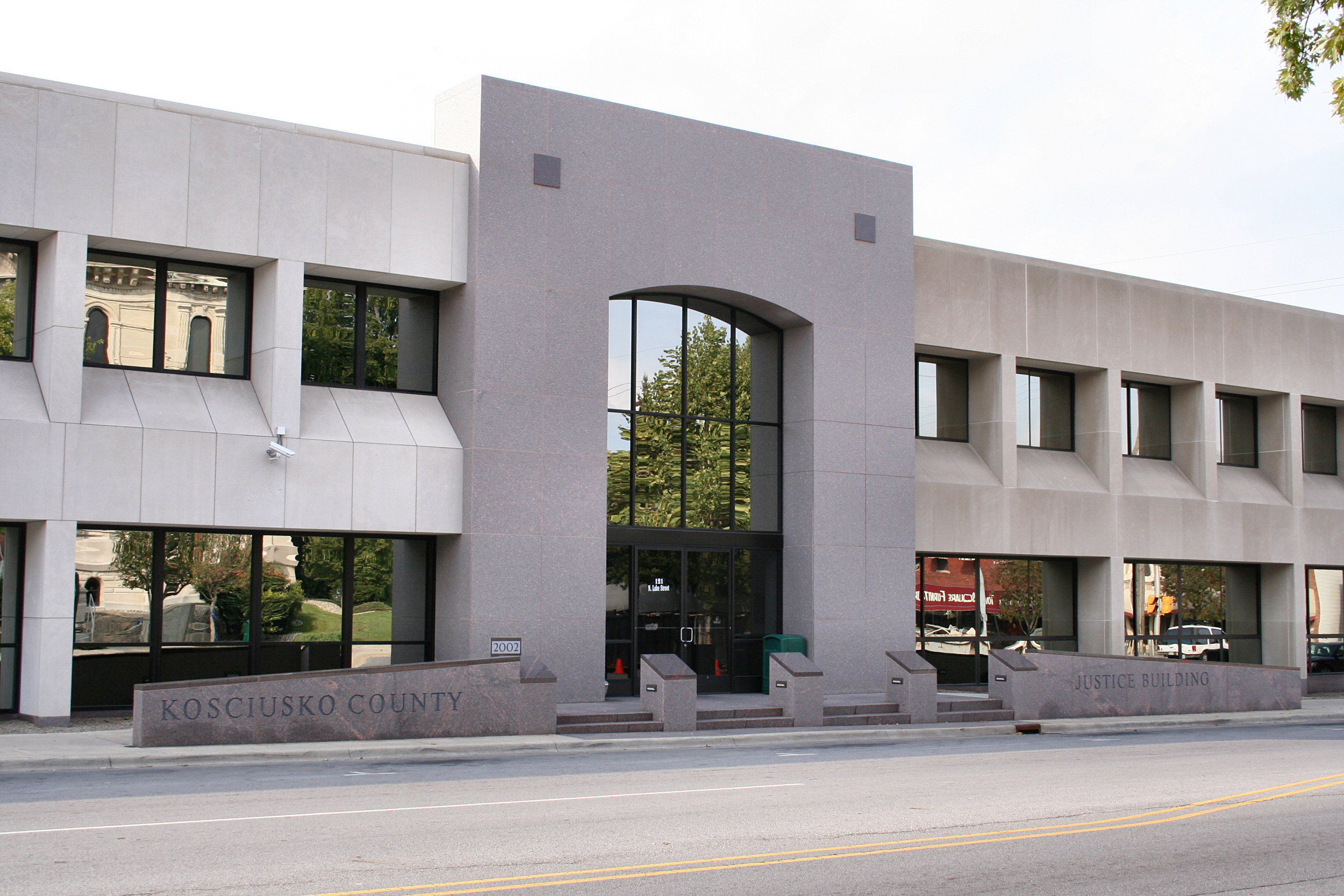
New county courthouse building.

There were 4,794 households, out of which 32.4% had children under the age of 18 living with them, 49.0% were married couples living together, 10.8% had a female householder with no husband present, and 36.0% were non-families. 30.4% of all households were made up of individuals, and 11.8% had someone living alone who was 65 years of age or older. The average household size was 2.49 and the average family size was 3.11.

In the city, the population was spread out, with 26.0% under the age of 18, 10.9% from 18 to 24, 29.0% from 25 to 44, 21.0% from 45 to 64, and 13.2% who were 65 years of age or older. The median age was 34 years. For every 100 females, there were 97.3 males. For every 100 females age 18 and over, there were 93.3 males.

The median income for a household in the city was $36,564, and the median income for a family was $45,153. Males had a median income of $33,322 versus $22,284 for females. The per capita income for the city was $19,262. About 6.8% of families and 9.2% of the population were below the poverty line, including 8.7% of those under age 18 and 13.4% of those age 65 or over.

== Government ==
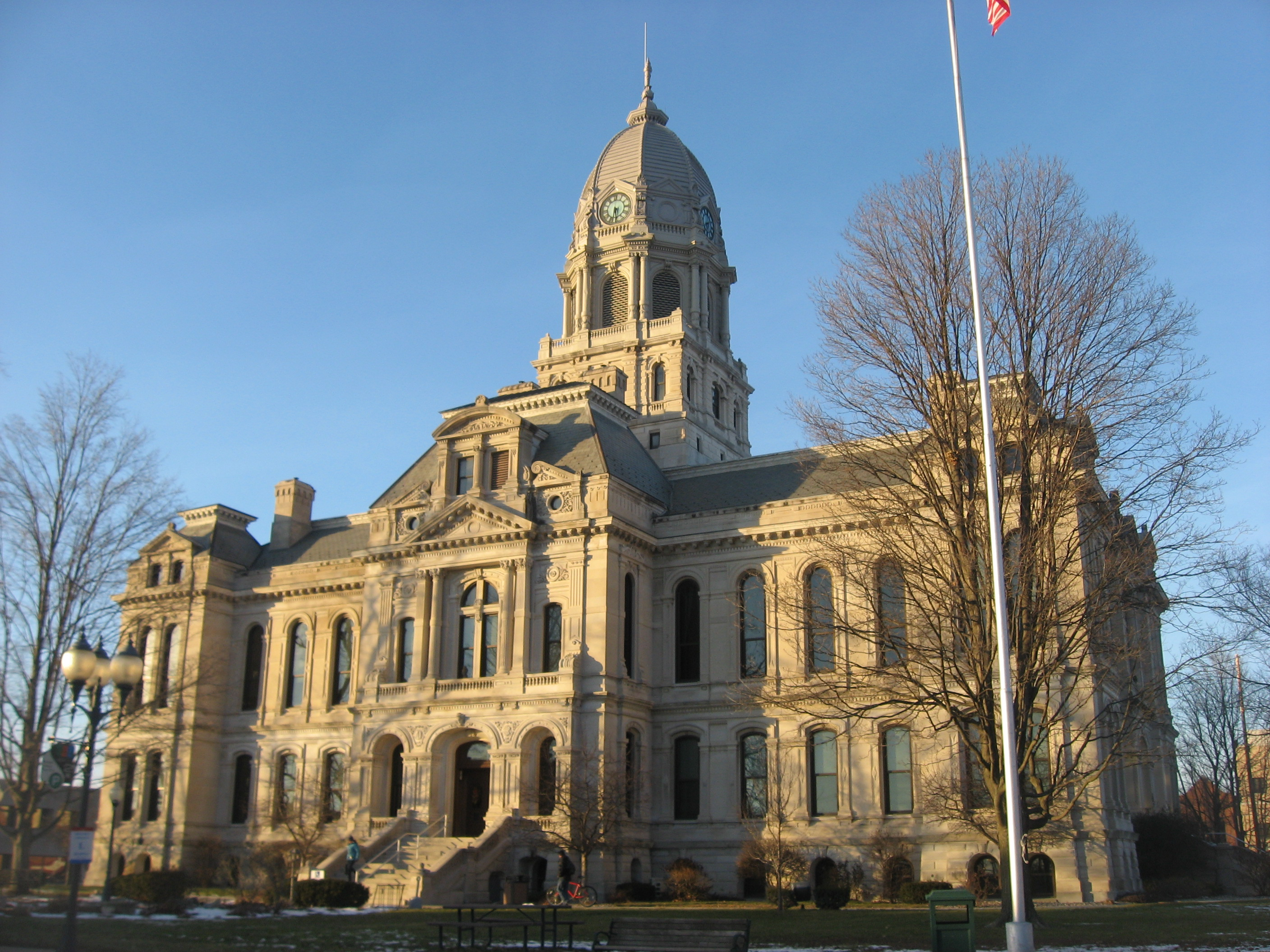
Old Kosciusko County Courthouse.

Warsaw has an elected mayor, clerk and city council-style of government. Officials are elected for four-year terms. Warsaw's current mayor is Republican Jeff Grose, who has served since January 1, 2024. Paul E. "Mike" Hodges is Warsaw's longest-serving mayor, who served for five non-consecutive terms from 1952 to 1983.

=== Representatives - common council ===
The Warsaw Common Council is a seven-member legislative group that serve four-year terms. Five of the members represent specific districts; two are elected citywide as at-large council members.

- Cindy Dobbins: At-large
- Jack Wilhite: At-large
- Juergen Voss 1st district
- Josh Finch: 2nd district
- Mike Klondaris: 3rd district
- William "Jerry" Frush: 4th district
- Diane Quance: 5th district

== Economy ==
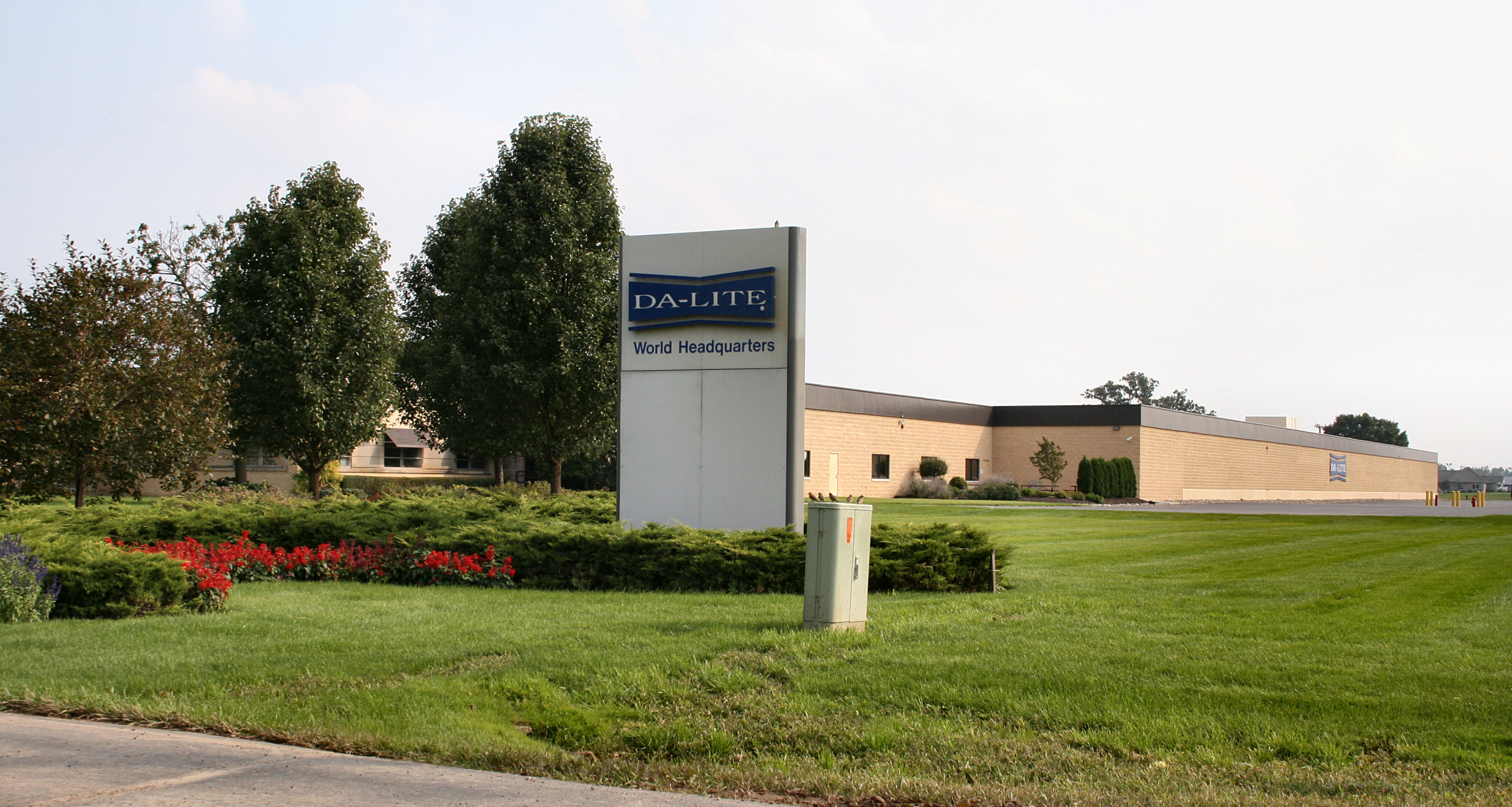
Da-Lite headquarters building.

Warsaw, known as the "Orthopedic Capital of the World", is home to the first orthopedic device manufacturer, the DePuy Manufacturing Company, started in 1895 by Revra DePuy. Competitors, such as Zimmer, Inc. in 1927 and Biomet, Inc. in 1977, have subsequently been founded in Warsaw to support the industry. Several orthopedic suppliers are also present.

Other companies headquartered in Warsaw are Da-Lite, makers of commercial and home theater projection screens; LSC Communications, a commercial printing press; ABC Industries, a leader in mining ventilation products and industrial textile fabrics; Explorer Van Company, a custom conversion van manufacturer; and PayLeap, a payment gateway service provider.

American electric vehicle startup Slate Auto, an EV that can be configured as a pickup truck or an SUV, has a factory located in Warsaw.

Historically, Warsaw was home to Dalton Foundry, a malleable iron casting foundry; Penguin Point, a regional fast-food chain and Biltwell Basket Company, which specialized in manufacturing commercial, agricultural, and utility wooden baskets.

== Culture ==
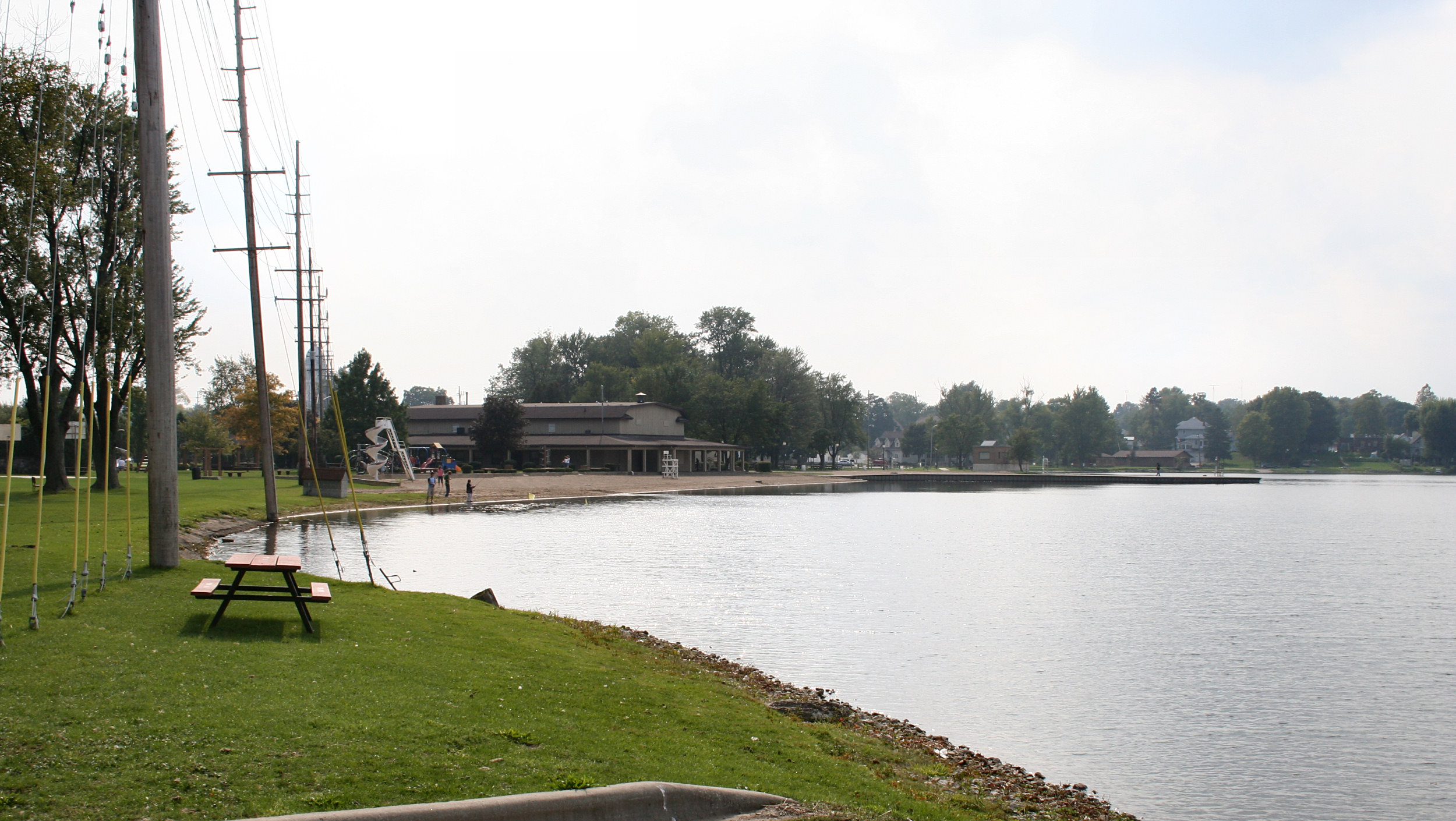
Center Lake Park in October 2005, located on the shore of Center Lake

Warsaw is home to the Wagon Wheel Center for the Arts, founded in 1956 and becoming a non-profit organization in 2011 featuring a "theatre in the round".

Movies shot in Warsaw include American Teen by Nanette Burstein which premiered at Sundance Film Festival, New Life (film), produced by Erin Bethea, Long Gone By and Room 441.

City Parks, the Lake City Greenway Trails, City County Athletic Complex (CCAC) and two golf courses offer citizens recreation. Central Park, which overlooks Center Lake, is host to regular concerts during the summer months.

Center Lake Park includes the Warsaw Biblical Gardens which is a noted Biblical garden.

The Rotary Club of Warsaw was chartered on June 1, 1919, being one of the oldest clubs in the community and part of Rotary International residence.

== Radio ==
- WRSW-FM, Classic Hits 107.3 is the 50,000-watt heritage station of the Warsaw community for over 70 years
- "Willie 103.5" WAWC is Warsaw's Fun Country Station began broadcasting in Warsaw in November 2006
- News Now Warsaw 1480 AM and 99.7 FM (WRSW-AM provides National and Local News and Information around the clock
- WLAB, Star 88.3, broadcasts to the community, via its translator on FM radio frequency 90.9 FM
- Oldies 101.1, (WLQZ-LP), where they are "Always Playing a Better Oldie."

== Education ==
- Alternative Learning Center, public school · grades 9-12 · 680 students
- Charter College of Health and Massage Therapy
- Certified Natural Health Professionals · Natural Health Education and Certification
- Edgewood Middle School, public school · grades 7-8 · 887 students
- Eisenhower Elementary School, public school · grades K-6 · 523 students
- Grace College - Warsaw Campus
- Harrison Elementary School, public school. grades K-6. 611 students
- Indiana Tech - Warsaw Campus
- Ivy Tech Community College - North Central Campus
- Lakeland Christian Academy or LCA, private school · grades Pre K-12
- Lakeview Middle School, public school · grades 7-8 · 760 students
- Lighthouse Christian Academy, private school · grades Pre K-12 454 students
- Lincoln Elementary School, public school · grades K-6 · 456 students
- Living Stone's Preparatory School, private school · grades Pre K-12
- Madison Elementary School, public school · grades K-6 · 563 students
- Monarch Christian Academy, private School · grades K-12 · 23 students
- Sacred Heart School, private school · grades Pre K-6 · 206 students
- Trinity School of Natural Health · Distance Learning Natural Health Education
- Warsaw Community High School or WCHS, public school · grades 9-12 · 1,947 students
- Washington STEM Academy, public school · grades K-6 · 555 students

The city has a lending library, the Warsaw Community Public Library.

== Notable people ==
- Whitey Bell, NBA, ABL player (1959–1963)
- Ambrose Bierce, author of The Devil's Dictionary
- Jack E. Bowers. Illinois state legislator and lawyer
- Howard Brubaker, magazine editor and writer
- Shea Couleé, drag queen
- Jesse E. Eschbach, jurist
- David C. Fisher, author and pastor
- Rick Fox, actor and former NBA basketball player
- Randy Heisler, Olympic athlete
- Scottie James (born 1996), basketball player in the Israeli Basketball Premier League
- Gary Kosins, NFL player
- Hal Kratzsch, an original member of famed singing group The Four Freshmen
- James R. Leininger, physician, founder of Kinetic Concepts
- Harrison Mevis, professional football player
- Nic Moore, professional basketball player
- Marshall Plumlee, professional basketball player
- Mason Plumlee, professional basketball player
- Miles Plumlee, professional basketball player
- Max Truex, Olympic athlete
- Bubba the Love Sponge, radio personality
