= Kosciusko County Jail =

- U.S. National Register of Historic Places
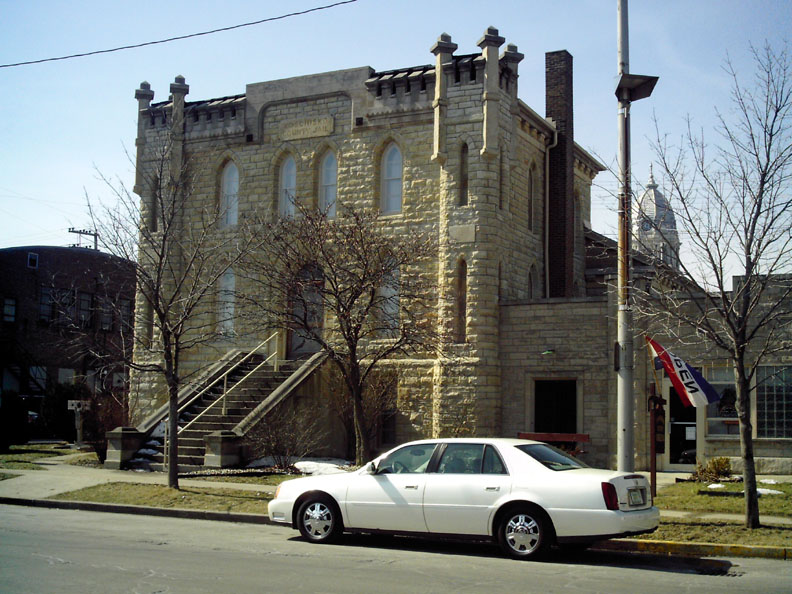
- Front and side of the Kosciusko County Jail, located at the intersection of Main and Indiana Streets in Warsaw, Indiana, United States.

- Location within Indiana Location within the United States
- Interactive map showing the location of Kosciusko County Jail
- Location: Main and Indiana Sts., Warsaw, Indiana
- Coordinates: 41°14′19″N 85°51′20″W
- Area: less than one acre
- Built: 1870
- Architect: Garnsey, George
- Architectural style: Castellated Gothic
- NRHP reference No.: 78000036
- Added to NRHP: December 8, 1978

The first Kosciusko County Jail was built in 1837 of 14 inches (36 cm) square logs. It was two stories tall with a trap door from the second story floor to access the ground floor. The next jail was made of brick. Like the first jail, it was located on Courthouse Square. By 1869 this second structure was in serious need of repair. Frequent jail breaks from the second jail, led the county to hire George Garnsey of Chicago to design a new jail. The most notable jailbreak resulted when prisoners pushed bricks out of the wall.

== Design ==
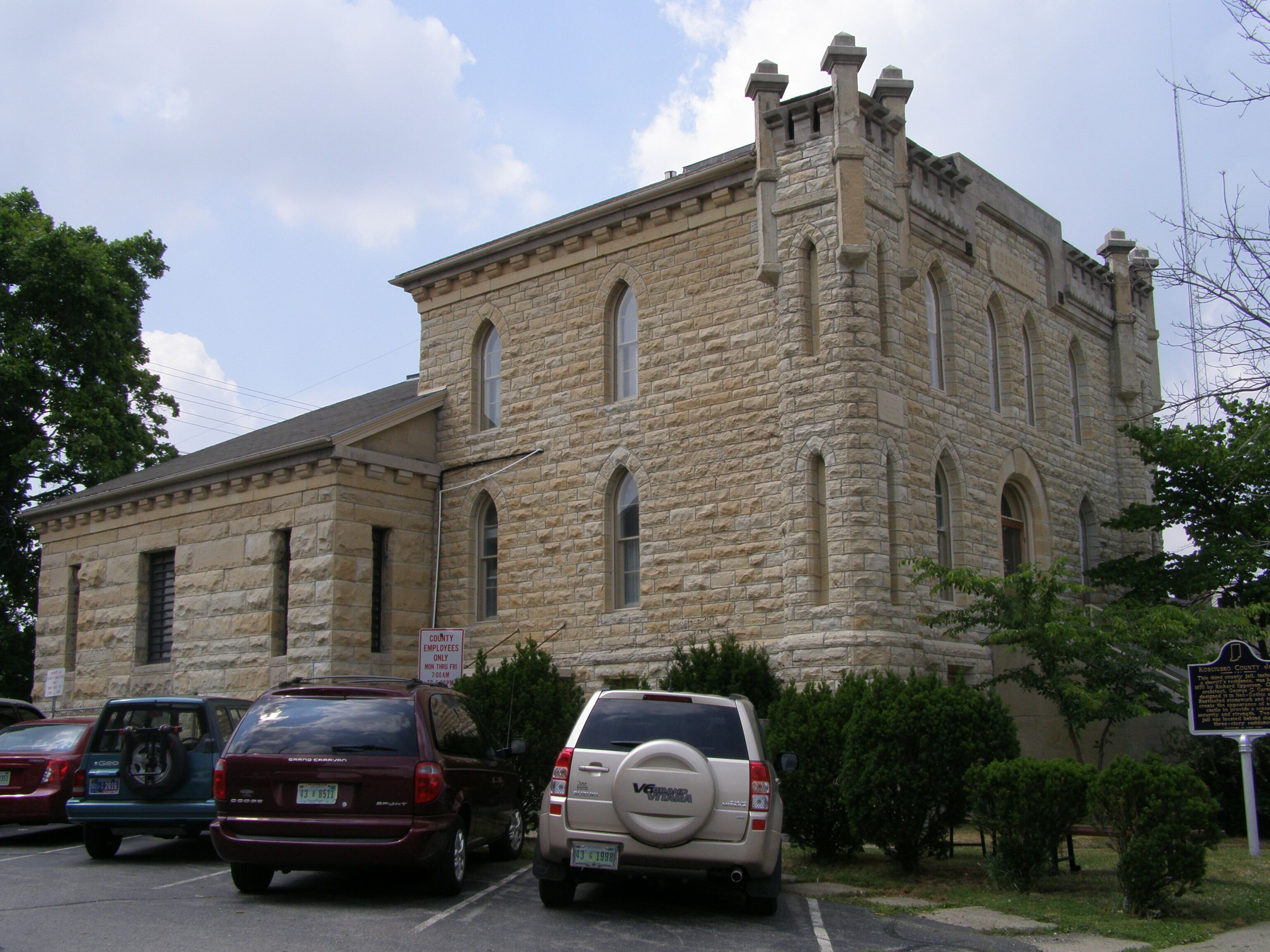
Kosciusko County Jail, Warsaw, Indiana

The jail is two stories on an elevated basement. The main entrance is up a flight of steps. Two windows flank the stairs on the basement level. All the windows are double-hung sashes with one-over-one lights.

On the north side a one-story garage was added in 1937. It is the only major alteration of the exterior. The stonework matches the original building. In 1964 the garage was made into office space.

== Museum ==
The building is now owned by the Kosciusko County Historical Society and operated as the Kosciusko County Jail Museum.

== See also ==
- Chinworth Bridge
- Warsaw Courthouse Square Historic District
- Winona Lake Historic District
