= Warsaw Courthouse Square Historic District =

Historic district in Indiana, United States

- U.S. National Register of Historic Places
- U.S. Historic district
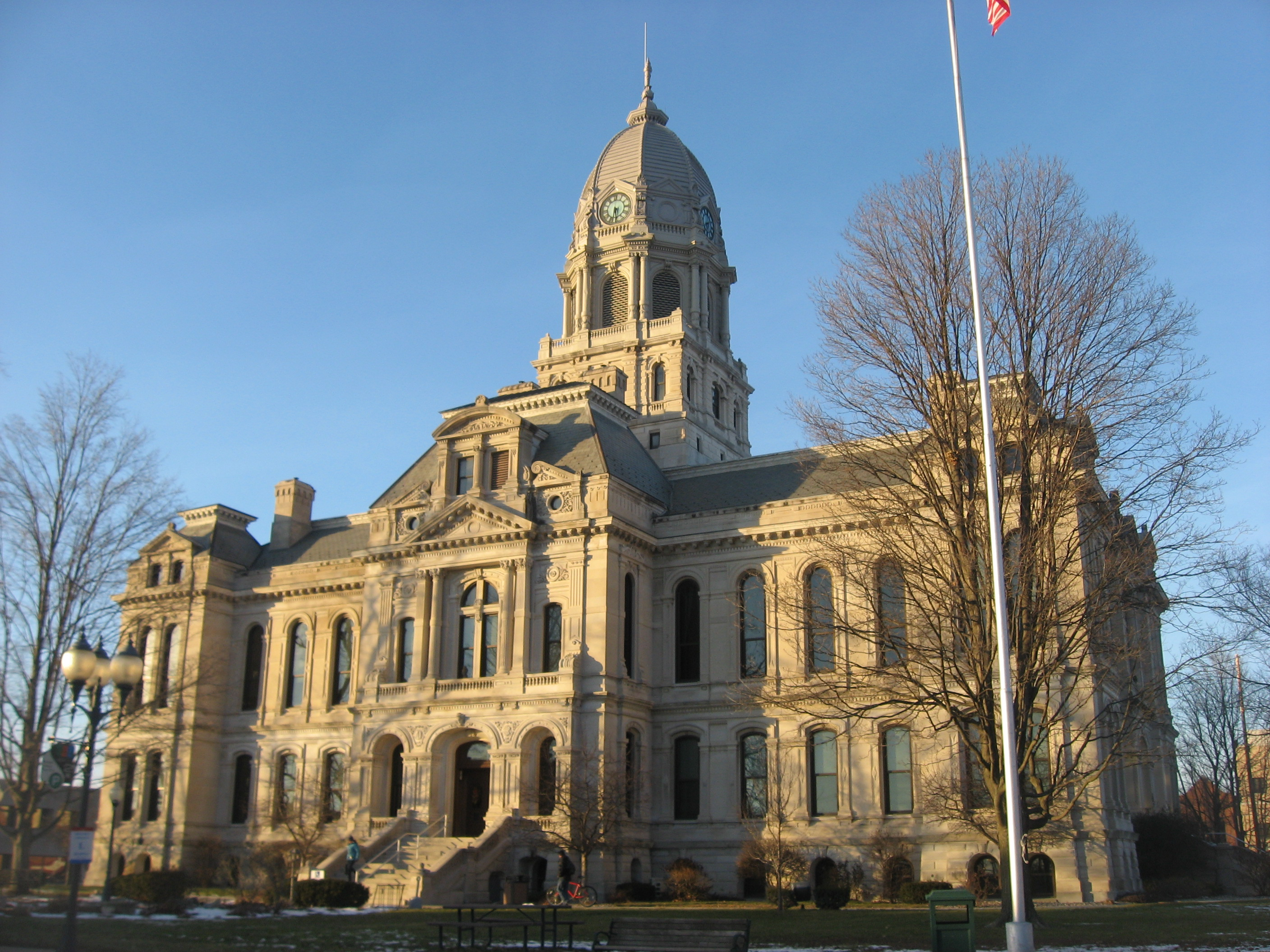
- Courthouse at the center of the district

- Location within Indiana Location within the United States
- Interactive map showing the location of Warsaw Courthouse Square Historical District
- Location: Bounded by Center, N. Lake, Main, and Indiana Sts. (original); Roughly bounded by W. Main, W. Lake, Center and S. Indiana Sts. and the alleys behind Indiana, Market, Lake and Main Sts (increase); Warsaw, Indiana
- Coordinates: 41°14′19″N 85°51′24″W
- Built: 1870
- Architect: Multiple
- Architectural style: Second Empire, Italianate, Gothic Revival (both)
- NRHP reference No.: 82000046 and 93000952
- Added to NRHP: March 1, 1982 (original); September 21, 1993 (increase)

The Warsaw Courthouse Square Historic District is a historic district in Warsaw, Indiana that was listed on the National Register of Historic Places in 1982. Its boundaries were increased in 1993.

== History ==
Warsaw was named after the capital of Poland, the homeland of the county's namesake, Thaddeus Kosciusko. Beginning in 1834, settlers arrived, a blacksmith shop and several dwellings were built. A year after being platted it was chosen as the county seat. In 1854 Pittsburgh, Fort Wayne and Chicago Railway came to town and growth began.

The Kosciusko County Jail was designed by George O. Garnsey and built by Richard Epperson in 1870, the Gothic Revival fortress-like jail is an intimidating sight. The Opera House was constructed in 1874 after a fire destroyed an earlier hall. This three-story brick building contained seating for 1,500 people. The former Odd Fellows Building dates from 1872. With more rail lines, canneries, flour mills, ice making and farm implements factories developed. In 1916 the Widaman-McDonald Building was built and housed a 500-seat Centennial Theatre. Prosperity continued into the twentieth century. Early in the century, the Winona Interurban Railway began operation, enabling people in the outlying areas to get to Warsaw quickly and inexpensively. A number of commercial buildings were constructed during this period including the Widaman-McDonald Building, the Eagles Lodge and two buildings on Center Street. The district's most impressive 20th century building is the Post Office designed by the Office of the Supervising Architect under James A. Wetmore in 1931.

== Location ==
The Warsaw Court House and Jail District consists of two city blocks in downtown Warsaw, Indiana. The district is bounded by Main Street, Indiana Street, Center Street and Lake Street.

== Significance ==
The District contains thirteen commercial and governmental buildings. The Kosciusko County Court House, the Saemann Building, and the Kosciusko County Jail are architecturally significant. The Eagles Building, the Widaman-McDonald Building, the Humpty Dumpty Restaurant contribute architecturally to the district. The buildings on Center Street provide a continuous façade line to the 16 feet (4.9 m) sidewalk as a group.

Like other counties, Kosciusko County built a magnificent courthouse in the center of the dense commercial district. The courthouse is the architectural and political centerpiece of the community. The nearby Jail, constructed eleven years before the courthouse, was designed by George O. Garnsey, of Chicago.

The Saemann Building (Crownover/Masonic Lodge Building) replaced a resort hotel that was destroyed by fire in 1883. A new hotel was being constructed down the street, it was decided to build a three-story commercial structure. The building had commercial establishments on the first floor, law offices on the second floor, and the third floor was Warsaw's Masonic Lodge.

== Inventory ==
All structures are historically contributing towards the Historic District Status, unless otherwise noted. An ‘O’ rating signifies that the structure had enough historic or architectural significance to be considered for individual listing in the National Register of Historic Places. The ‘N’ rating signifies that the structure is above average and may, with further investigation be eligible for an individual listing. The ‘C’ or contributing rating signifies that the structure meet the basic inventory qualifications, but fails to meet individual merit, but in combination with other closely placed similar structures warrants inclusion in an historic district.

West Center Street

- 202 Commercial Building; Twentieth Century Functional, c.1940 (C)
- Kosciusko County Courthouse; Victorian Eclectic, 1882-1884 (Thomas J. Tolan and Son, architect; Hiram Iddings, builder) (O) . The county's fourth courthouse was constructed between the years 1882–1884 at a cost of almost $200,000. The building's ornate limestone façade is highly articulated with decorative scrolls, garlands and classical columns. It is topped with a 162-feet domed tower visible for miles around. Second Empire Style, limestone construction, mansard roof with straight sides, central pavilion, paired windows, metal roof curbs, arched double doors with glass panels, belt courses, porthole dormers, tall chimneys with decorated caps. Eyebrow-like window heads and paneled frieze boards. A two-shelled dome with four clocks crowns the building. The Court House is surrounded by native hardwood trees. On the southeast corner of the square is a Civil War cannon. A World War II cannon is sited on the southwest corner of the square. On the Northwest corner is a World War II tank.

East Center Street

- 101, 103, 105 East Center Street- Saemann Building; Italianate, 1883 (N). The Saemann Building: 1883, the three-story Italianate brick structure. The boxed metal cornice wraps the south and west sides with friezes decoration and brackets, each façade have a decorated metal pediment, windows have arches with radiating brick voussoirs with metal keystones and metal lug sills.

Just east of the courthouse is the Saemann Building, which also served as the Masonic Lodge. The 1883 Italianate building features an elaborately bracketed cornice and a broken pediment bearing the Masons' distinctive emblem. Other smaller, less ornate commercial buildings from this period include the R. H. Hitzler Building and the H. S. Biggs Building.

- 107 East Center Street: c. 1890, redesigned c. 1935, 2 stories, masonry and stucco, glass block windows.
- 111 East Center Street: c. 1920, brick laid in running bond, soldier course brick over second floor windows, cut stone sills.
- 115, 117 East Center Street:
  - The Eagles Building: 1930, three stories with brick pilasters with stone capitals, stone coping, rectangular panels with rowlock brick and square stone corners, brick laid in header bond, soldier course brick over second and third floor windows, cut stone sills. Built for the Fraternal Order of Eagles by Mr. Hodges, designed by Mr. Jesse T. Osborn.
- 119 East Center Street: Widaman-McDonald Building; Craftsman, 1916 (N) . is two stories with 500-seat theatre and stage behind. The end bays of the south façade are defined by brick pilasters and each has a projected wood frame bay supported by decorative brackets. Brick is laid in stretcher bond, second floor windows have soldier course brick laid on steel lintels and cut stone lugsills.

Indiana Street

- Times Building: Twentieth Century Functional, c.1946 (N) .
- 121 Indiana Street:: Kosciusko County Jail; Gothic Revival, 1870/1937/1964 (G. O. Garnsey, architect; Richard Epperson, builder) (O) NR.
- At corner of Main Street: Kosciusko County Jail (Corner Main & Indiana Streets): 1870, three-story "Gothic Revival" building designed by Mr. George Garnsey and built by Mr. Richard Epperson.

South Buffalo Street

- 206 South Buffalo Street: Commercial Building; Italianate, 204 c.1880 (N).

North Buffalo Street

- 118 North Buffalo Street: Commercial Building: c. 1890, two-story brick with one-story brick addition in front, c. 1920.
- 116 North Buffalo Street: Commercial Building: c. 1920, two-story brick structure.
- 114 North Buffalo Street: The Humpty Dumpty Restaurant: c. 1890, Italianate with boxed cornice, brackets and frieze decoration.
- 112 North Buffalo Street: Commercial building: c. 1910, one-story masonry with columns.
- 108 North Buffalo Street: Commercial Building; Italianate, c.1890 (N).

South Lake Street

- U.S. Post Office: Colonial Revival, 1931 (James A. Wetmore, architect; Ideal

Construction Company, contractor) (O).

North Lake Street

- 201 First Christian Church: Gothic Revival, 1889 (O) .

== See also ==
- Chinworth Bridge
- Kosciusko County Jail
- Winona Lake Historic District
