= List of lakes of Indiana =

This is a list of lakes in the U.S. state of Indiana. The lakes are ordered by their unique names (i.e. Lake Indiana or Indiana Lake would both be listed under "I"). Swimming, fishing, and/or boating are permitted in some of these lakes, but not all.

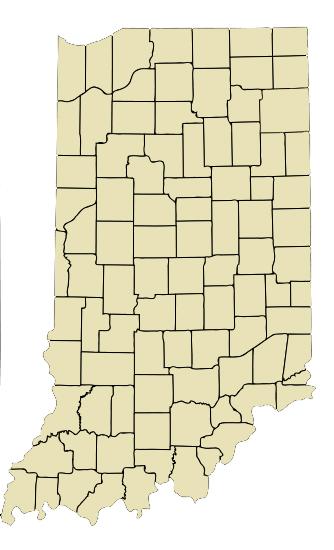
Map of the 92 counties of the State of Indiana

== A ==
- Adams Lake, LaGrange County
- Atwood Lake, LaGrange County

== B ==
- Ball Lake, Steuben County
- Banning Lake (Barbee Lake Chain), Kosciusko County
  - Natural lake
- Barton Lake, Steuben County
- Bass Lake, Starke County
  - Part of Bass Lake State Beach
  - Natural lake
- Barr Lake, Noble County
- Bear Lake, Noble County
- Beedy Lake, Allen County
- Big Barbee Lake (Barbee Lake Chain), Kosciusko County
  - Natural lake
- Big Lake, Noble County
- Big Long Lake, LaGrange County
- Big Turkey Lake, LaGrange & Steuben County
- Blue Lake, Southwest Indianapolis
- Blue Lake, Whitley County
- Boot Lake, Elkhart County
- Bowen Lake (Chain O'Lakes), Whitley County
- Briarwood Lake, Morgan County
- Brookville Lake, Franklin & Union County
  - Part of the Mounds State Recreation Area (SRA) & Quakertown SRA
- Lake Bruce, Pulaski & Fulton County
- Brown Lake (Mud Lake), Steuben County

== C ==
- Cagles Mill Lake, Putnam & Owen County
  - Part of the Lieber State Recreation Area (SRA)
- Canada Lake, Porter County
- Cecil M. Harden Lake (Raccoon Lake), Parke County
  - Part of Raccoon SRA
- Cedar Lake, Lake County
  - Natural lake
- Cedarville Reservoir, Allen County
- Center Lake, Kosciusko County
- North Chain Lake, St. Joseph County
- South Chain Lake, St. Joseph County
- Chamberlain Lake, St. Joseph County
- Chapman Lake, Kosciusko County
- Clear Lake, Steuben County
  - Natural lake
- Cook Lake, Marshall County
- Cordry Lake, Brown County
- Crooked Lake, Steuben County
  - Natural lake
- Crooked Lake, Whitley County
- Crystal Lake, Kosciusko County

== D ==
- Dallas Lake (Indian Lake Chain), LaGrange County
- Deam Lake, Clark County
  - Part of Deam Lake State Recreation Area (SRA)
- Deep Lake, Porter County
- Dewart Lake, Kosciusko County
- Dock Lake (Chain O'Lakes), Whitley County
- Dogwood Lake, Daviess County
- Dollar Lake (Mud Lake), LaGrange County

== E ==
- Eagle Creek Reservoir, Marion County
- Eagle Lake, Boone County
- Eagle Lake, Starke County
- Earlham Lake, Johnson County
- Lake Edgewood, Morgan County
- Lake Everett, Allen County

== F ==
- Finster Lakes (Chain O'Lakes), Whitley County
- Upper Fish Lake, LaGrange County
- Lower Fish Lake, LaGrange County
- Fishtrap Lake, LaPorte County
- Fites Lake, Porter County
- Flat Lake, Marshall County
- Fletcher Lake, Fulton County
- Flint Lake, Porter County
- Fox Lake, Steuben County
- Lake Freeman, Carroll & White County

== G ==
- Lake Gage, Steuben County
- Geist Reservoir, Hamilton & Marion County
- Lake Geneva, Switzerland County
- Lake George, Lake County (Hammond)
- Lake George, Lake County (Hobart)
- Lake George, Steuben County (also extends into Branch County, Michigan)
- Gibson Lake (Broad Pond), Gibson County
- Gilbert Lake, Noble County
- Golden Lake, Steuben County
- Goose Lake, Whitley County
- Grand Boulevard Lake, Lake County
- Grandview Lake, Bartholomew County
- Greenwood Lake, Martin County
- Griffy Lake, Monroe County

== H ==
- Hackenburg Lake (Indian Lake Chain), LaGrange County
- Hadley Lake, Tippecanoe County
- Hamilton Lake, Steuben County
- Hardy Lake, Scott & Jefferson County
- Harrison Lake, Bartholomew County
- Hart Lake, Morgan County
- Hartz Lake, Starke County
- Heaton Lake, Elkhart County
- Heritage Lake, Putnam County
- Heron Lake (Barbee Lake Chain), Kosciusko County
  - Natural lake
- Hoffman Lake, Kosciusko County
- Lake Holiday Hide-Away, Fountain County
- Hudson Lake, LaPorte County
- Huntington Lake, Huntington County

== I ==
- Indian Lake, Marion County
- Indiana Lake, Elkhart County (also extends into Cass County, Michigan)
- Irish Lake (Barbee Lake Chain), Kosciusko County

== J ==
- Lake James, Steuben County
  - Part of Pokagon State Park
  - Third largest natural lake in Indiana
- Jimmerson Lake, Steuben County
- Jones Lake, Noble County

== K ==
- Kayak Lake, Sullivan County
  - A water-filled, surface coal mine in Hamilton Township
- Lake Kickapoo, Greene County
  - Located in Shakamak State Park
- Knapp Lake, Noble County
- Koontz Lake, Starke & Marshall County
- Kreiger Lake (Chain O'Lakes), Whitley County
- Kuhn Lake (Barbee Lake Chain), Kosciusko County
  - Natural lake

== L ==
- Lamb Lake, Johnson County
  - Private lake in Hensley Township
- Lake Latonka Dam, Marshall County
- Lawrence Lake, Marshall County
- Lake Lemon, Monroe & Brown County
- Little Barbee Lake (Barbee Lake Chain), Kosciusko County
  - Natural lake
- Lone Hickory Lake (Mud Lake), Steuben County
- Long Lake, Porter County (Indiana Dunes National Park)
- Long Lake, Porter County (Valparaiso)
- Long Lake, Steuben County
- Long Lake, Wabash County
- Long Lake (Chain O'Lakes), Whitley County
- Loomis Lake, Porter County
- Loon Lake, Whitley & Noble County
- Lutheran Lake, Bartholomew County

== M ==
- Lake Manitou, Fulton County
  - Natural lake
- Martin Lake, LaGrange County
- Lake Maxinkuckee, Marshall County
  - Second largest natural lake in Indiana
- McDonald Lake, Vermillion County
- Messick Lake (Indian Lake Chain), LaGrange County
- Lake Michigan, Lake, Porter, & LaPorte County
  - Part of Indiana Dunes State Park & National Park
- Miller Lake (Chain O'Lakes), Whitley County
- Mink Lake, Porter County
- Mississinewa Lake, Wabash & Miami County
  - Part of the Frances Slocum State Recreation Area (SRA), Miami SRA, Pearson Mill SRA, & Red Bridge SRA
- Mohawk Lake, Sullivan County
  - A water-filled, surface coal mine in Hamilton Township
- Lake Monroe (Monroe Reservoir), Monroe County
  - Part of Allen's Creek SRA, Cutright SRA, Crooked Creek SRA, Fairfax SRA, Moore's Creek SRA, Paynetown SRA, Pine Grove SRA, & Salt Creek SRA
- Morse Reservoir, Hamilton County
- Moss Lake, Porter County
- Mud Lake, Fulton County
- Mud Lake, Kosciusko County
- Mud Lake, LaGrange County
- Mud Lake, Marshall County
- Mud Lake, Noble County (Avilla)
- Mud Lake, Noble County (Burr Oak)
- Mud Lake, Noble County (Wolcottville)
- Mud Lake, Porter County (Chesterton)
- Mud Lake, Porter County (Valparaiso)
- Mud Lake, St. Joseph County
- Mud Lake, Steuben County (Angola, near East 275 South & South Bill Deller Road)
- Mud Lake, Steuben County (Angola, near I-69 & US 20)
- Mud Lake, Steuben County (Clear Lake)
- Mud Lake, Steuben County (Stroh)
- Mud Lake, Wabash County
- Mud Lake (Chain O'Lakes), Whitley County
- Muncie Lake, Noble County
- Myers Lake, Marshall County

== N ==
- Nauvoo Lake (Mud Lake), LaGrange County
- Norman Lake (Chain O'Lakes), Whitley County
- Nyona Lake, Fulton County

== O ==
- Olin Lake, LaGrange County
  - The largest undeveloped lake in the state
- Oliver Lake, LaGrange County
- Oswego Lake, Kosciusko County
  - Natural lake
- Otter Lake, Steuben County

== P ==
- Lake Papakeechie, Kosciusko County
- Patoka Lake, Orange, Dubois, & Crawford County
- Pierceton Lake (Mud Lake), Kosciusko County
- Pike Lake, Kosciusko County
- Pine Lake, LaPorte County
- Lake Pleasant, Steuben County (north)
- Pleasant Lake, Steuben County (south)
- Prairie Creek Reservoir, Delaware County
- Pretty Lake, LaGrange County
- Pretty Lake, Marshall County
- Prince East Lake, Johnson County
- Prince North Lake, Johnson County
- Prince White Lake, Johnson County

== R ==
- Riddles Lake, St. Joseph County
- Ridinger Lake, Kosciusko County
- Rivir Lake (Chain O'Lakes), Whitley County
- Royer Lake, LaGrange County

== S ==
- Sagers Lake, Porter County
- Salamonie Lake, Wabash & Huntington County
- Sand Lake (Chain O'Lakes), Whitley County
- Lake Santee, Decatur County
- Saugany Lake, LaPorte County
- Sawmill Lake (Barbee Lake Chain), Kosciusko County
- Schaefer Lake, Bartholomew County
- Sechrist Lake (Barbee Lake Chain), Kosciusko County
- Lake Shafer, White County
- Shipeshewana Lake, LaGrange County
- Shoe Lake, Kosciusko County
- Shriner Lake, Whitley County
- Silver Lake, Steuben County
- Simonton Lake, Elkhart County, Indiana
- Skinner Lake, Decatur & Franklin County
- Snow Lake, Steuben County
- South Clear Lake, St. Joseph County (also extends into Berrien County, Michigan)
- Spectacle Lake, Porter County
- Stanton Lake, Kosciusko County
- Steinbarger Lake, Noble County
- Stone Lake, LaPorte County
- Sucker Lake (Chain O'Lakes), Whitley County
- Sugar Mill Lake, Fountain County
- Summit Lake Henry County
  - Located within Summit Lake State Park
- Sweetwater Lake, Brown County
- Sylvan Lake, Noble County
- Syracuse Lake, Kosciusko County
  - Natural lake

== T ==
- Tamarack Lake, Noble County
- Lake Tippecanoe, Kosciusko County
  - Natural lake
- Trader's Point Lake, Marion County

== U ==
- University Lake, Monroe County
  - Located on the Indiana University Bloomington campus

== V ==
- Viberg Lake, Allen County

== W ==
- Waldron Lake, Noble County
- Wall Lake, LaGrange County
- Wapehani Lake (Weimer Lake), Monroe County
  - A reservoir on West Fork Clear Creek in Bloomington
- Waubee Lake, Kosciusko County
- Wauhob Lake, Porter County
- Lake Wawasee, Kosciusko County
  - The largest natural lake in Indiana
- Weber Lake (Chain O'Lakes), Whitley County
- Webster Lake, Kosciusko County
- West Boggs Lake, Daviess & Martin County
- West Otter Lake, Steuben County
- Westler Lake (Indian Lake Chain), LaGrange County
- Whippoorwill Lake, Morgan County
- Williams Lake, Noble County
- Winona Lake, Kosciusko County
  - Natural lake
- Witmer Lake, LaGrange County
- Wolf Lake, Lake County (also extends into Cook County, Illinois)
- Lake Woodland, Hamilton County
- Worster Lake, located within Potato Creek State Park, St. Joseph County

== Z ==
- Zehner Millpond, Marshall County

== See also ==
- List of lakes in the United States
- List of rivers in Indiana
