= John Pound Store =

- U.S. National Register of Historic Places
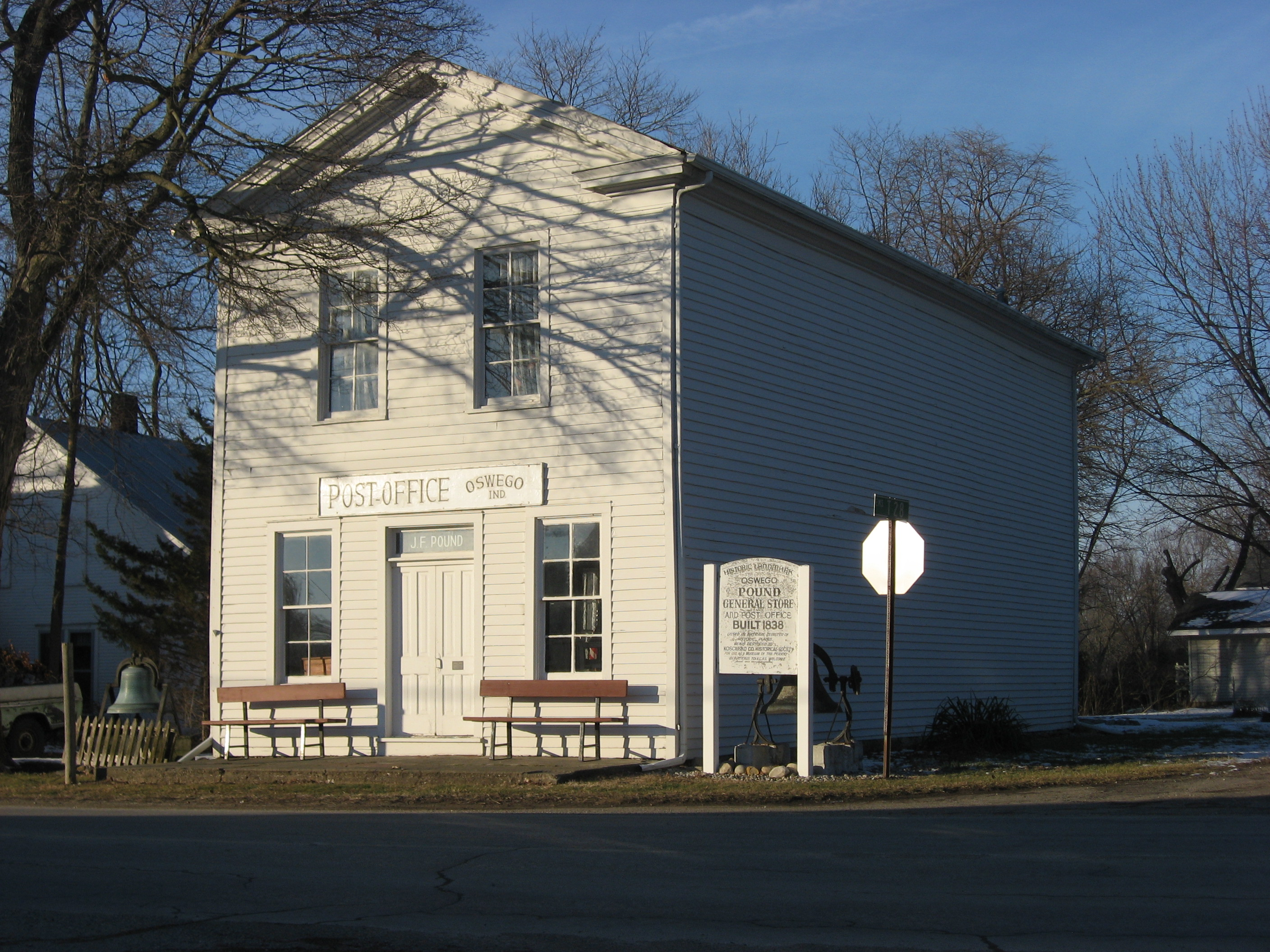
- John Pound Store, January 2013

- Location within Indiana Location within the United States
- Location: Junction of Armstrong Rd. and 2nd St. at Oswego, Indiana
- Coordinates: 41°19′13″N 85°47′15″W
- Area: less than one acre
- Built: 1838
- Architectural style: Greek Revival
- NRHP reference No.: 92000672
- Added to NRHP: June 17, 1992

John Pound Store is a historic commercial building located in Plain Township, Kosciusko County, Indiana. It was built in 1838, and is a two-story, rectangular Greek Revival style frame building with a front gable roof. It measures 20 feet wide and 49 feet deep and has a low pitched roof. It is operated by the Kosciusko County Historical Society as the Pound Store Museum.

It was listed on the National Register of Historic Places in 1992.
