= Leesburg Historic District =

Leesburg Historic District may refer to:

- Leesburg (Salmon, Idaho), a community and historic district listed on the NRHP in Lemhi County, Idaho
- Leesburg Historic District (Leesburg, Indiana), listed on the NRHP in Kosciusko County, Indiana
- Leesburg Historic District (Leesburg, Virginia), listed on the NRHP in Virginia

== See also ==
- Leesburg (disambiguation)
