= Lingle =

Lingle can refer to:

== People ==
- Jake Lingle (1891–1930), American newspaper reporter and racketeer
- Linda Lingle (born 1953), former governor of Hawaii
- Walter Lee Lingle (1868–1956), 11th president of Davidson College

== Places in the United States ==
- Lingle, Wyoming, a town
- Lingle Creek, Iowa
- Lingle Lake, a former name of Dewart Lake, Indiana
