= Hobart Freeman =

American preacher (1920–1984)

- Born: October 17, 1920; Ewing, Kentucky
- Died: December 8, 1984 (aged 64); Shoe Lake in Kosciusko County IN
- Occupations: Charismatic preacher & author

Hobart Freeman (October 17, 1920 – December 8, 1984) was a charismatic preacher and author, who ministered in northern Indiana and actively promoted faith healing.

== Early life ==
Hobart Edward Freeman was born in Ewing, Kentucky, and grew up at St. Petersburg, Florida, where he became a successful businessman after studying at Bryant and Stratton Business Institute, despite being a high school dropout. He also contracted polio, and in later years "... walked stiffly ... with an obvious limp."

Freeman was converted to Christ in 1952 at the age of 31, and baptized into a congregation within the Southern Baptist Convention.

Shortly before Freeman received "the baptism in the Holy Spirit", he survived a heart attack. He "claimed" his healing, disposed of his medications, and almost immediately suffered a series of angina attacks, which eventually subsided.

Freeman felt called to the ministry, and was subsequently educated at the Georgetown College with a Bible and History major, and then at the Southern Baptist Theological Seminary (A.B., Th.M.) with an Old Testament major. In 1961, he earned a Doctorate of Theology from Grace Theological Seminary in Winona Lake, Indiana with a thesis entitled "The Doctrine of Substitution in the Old Testament", and was appointed a professor of Hebrew and Old Testament Studies, and Philosophy and Ethics.

== Teaching and preaching ==
According to John Davis, Freeman came to be deeply influenced by Kenneth E. Hagin, John Osteen, Kenneth Copeland, T. L. Osborn and E. W. Kenyon, who were leaders of the Word of Faith Movement. However Freeman explicitly rejected their Doctrine of Identification, which asserted that Jesus died spiritually, and he also repeatedly warned his congregation about the leaders and their teachings.

Freeman's opposition to that doctrine was confirmed by Daniel McConnell. However McConnell also described Freeman as a "renegade preacher of the Faith movement" who "eventually broke with the other Faith teachers".

While the exact details continue to be debated, it is not unreasonable to include Freeman within the orbit of the Word of Faith Movement, as he also taught that healing was "promised in the atonement", and in Faith for Healing, where he also taught that "Confession brings possession, for what you confess is your faith speaking." These latter ideas aroused much opposition within the seminary, and Freeman was asked to leave in 1963.

Freeman established his own congregation, subsequently known as Faith Assembly, with Melvin Greider in 1963 in his own home at Winona Lake in nearby Kosciusko County. And for many years, worked 15–16 hours a day, seven days a week with seemingly indeflatable energy, and at one point visited Israel.

Within a few years, Freeman established a house church at Claypool in a "pink house next to the water tower", where the meetings followed a simple format:

After much singing and what sounded like people quoting the Bible, a tall lanky man, who looked remarkably like Billy Graham, walked stiffly to the front with an obvious limp. He was the pastor, Dr. Hobart Freeman, and he commanded everyone's attention. He had a Ph.D. in theology, and he was teaching the last in a series of messages on the book of Revelation. He spoke for an hour or more about the end of the world and the new heavens and the new earth. He spoke with the conviction that all these things were going to happen just like the Bible said. ... That night ... [the] singing was even livelier than early that morning, and the message was about faith. This church believed that God would really answer their prayers if they just believed. The pastor told stories of people being healed of sickness and being protected in storms by commanding the winds to stop. He believed that his leg would be healed from the polio he had had years before. ... At the end of the service, we went to the front for prayers ....

From there the church moved to a three-car garage, then on to an old sheep barn near North Webster where they had been holding a coffeehouse ministry on Friday nights. The barn was owned by a burly, whiskery biker, Melvin Greider nicknamed Mack, a former alcoholic who had become a Christian, and was named the "Glory Barn" by Freeman. This ministry attracted hundreds of people, including some misfits but most were normal, serious-minded young adults. The local people referred to the Glory Barn in derision and spread exaggerated rumours about what was done there.

This was not the opinion of those who sat under this ministry:

As we sat under Dr. Freeman's ministry, we saw his genius as a teacher. His theology was as solid as a Baptist minister, but he had the fire of a Pentecostal maverick like Smith Wigglesworth or William Branham. And he had the guts of the early martyrs. His manner was bookish, but he was such a skilled teacher that he kept our attention long enough to teach us biblical theology in terms we could understand. We eventually heard him teach on every passage in the Bible, and he backed up his positions, putting them in the context of church history and current events. All the reasoning was so logical it appealed to our minds as well as our hearts.

Eventually both the upper and lower levels of the Glory Barn were filled to overflowing. The floorboards bent and shook dangerously as the congregation danced "charismatic jigs" to the praise songs. They would travel long distances and stand in long lines early each Sunday morning to ensure a good seat. The many young assistant pastors had reserved seats up front. These young pastors travelled and spoke at meetings over a wide area. There was a worldwide following through his tapes and books. There were some 15,000 in daughter congregations elsewhere in Indiana, Illinois, Kentucky, Ohio, Michigan, Missouri, Tennessee and Florida, as well as in England, Australia, Canada, Switzerland and Germany.

Freeman also began teaching college-level classes on Saturday mornings covering Old and New Testament theology, Christian ethics, church history and even Hebrew.

In 1978 after conflict with the owner, Freeman took the congregation to a large circus tent just north of Warsaw and then on to another near Goshen throughout that summer and autumn. There was little protection from the wind and rain or the heat and cold. The nursery was a row of vans for the mothers and babies. Portable toilets were the only facilities. By winter a meeting hall had been built near North Webster in a cornfield belonging to one of the congregation. There were large bathrooms, a nursery for the mothers and babies, and a meeting room large enough to hold 2,000 people which was often overflowing. It wasn't fancy for the floors were cement, and the walls were bare. At the end of the summer of 1980 there was an epidemic of whooping cough that seemed to go through all the families of the congregation.

Like many charismatic congregations, the work of the Holy Spirit was emphasized – with claims of prophecy, miraculous healings, testimonies, speaking in tongues and believers being slain in the Spirit. Freeman's teaching emphasized the deeper life in the Spirit, overcoming all things, separation from the world and its ways, trusting only in God for all things, the crucified life, and the true meaning of discipleship, as seen in the topics covered by his teaching tapes and literature.

The authority of Freeman's teaching was regularly reinforced by his "prophecies", published with meeting notices, such as this from January 15, 1984.

January 15, 1984 Prophecy given through Brother Freeman after the message:
Overcomers – Avoid the Snare of Good Intentions

For I the Lord your God have detected that in your midst stands the enemy. You have allowed the enemy to come in and rob you of your prayers and intercession on behalf of this body, and of your faith in the process.

And so I would admonish you, saith the Lord, to be much in prayer in this endtime for your brother and sister. Do not depend alone on intercessors in the body, but you, you be an intercessor, and be in prayer for your brother and sister, for the ministry, that the anointing, as the word comes forth, will not be lost upon you. For it shall not abide on you except you are in a spiritual condition of being prayed up to date for yourself, for your family, for this church, which is your family, and in every way to build yourself up in the most holy faith by praying in the Spirit.

Have I not told you so in Jude 20, in Ephesians 6:18, to pray for yourself, and to pray for your brother, to pray for one another?

For I have detected that the enemy has moved in and sown his tares, saith the Lord, in your hearts, and you have become careless.

So receive this admonishment, this rebuke as from Me, saith the Lord, and profit from it; and see if I will not again open the windows of heaven and bless you spiritually, physically, in every way, saith the Lord!

Freeman's teaching also generated a social dimension. A sense of community care, cohesion, exclusiveness, superiority and persecution grew with the breadth, authority and enthusiasm of his teaching. Those with divergent doctrines, beliefs or practices either conformed or were excluded. Outside interactions grew less and were sometimes severed over these issues. Evangelical outreach shrivelled. So while legalism was denounced from the pulpit, it was practiced amongst the congregation to the extent that it has been described as "cultist tendencies". These teachings were comprehensive and logical, including the roles of women, music, jobs, medical science, government, the military, education, birth control, sports and holidays. Christmas was condemned as a pagan festival. A woman's role in the home as a wife and mother was seen to be the most noble and worthiest of callings. Children were regarded as a blessing from God and birth control was actively discouraged.

This led to a certain degree of uniformity within the congregation:

People outside Faith Assembly joked that we all looked alike. A typical Faith Assembly family on their way to church consisted of a man, who was probably a construction worker, carrying a notebook and Bible under one arm and a diaper bag over his shoulder. He would be walking with his wife, who would be wearing a denim skirt and carrying a baby, with several other kids in tow. They would drive a van.

Christianity Today reported that "According to Freeman's faith-formula theology, God is obligated to heal every sickness if a believer's faith is genuine. Faith must be accompanied by positive confession, meaning that believers must claim the healing by acknowledging that it has taken place." This understanding was more or less accepted by the pastorate, with the wife of one recalling that "Dr. Freeman taught that it was always God's will to heal in response to our faith, and that God would do it without the aid of doctors or medicine." In consequence, doctors and medicine came to be disparaged and reviled.

Hobart Freeman did write that "... we must practice thought control. We must deliberately empty our minds of everything negative concerning the person, problem, or situation confronting us ..." And he continued writing that "Sickness often can only be overcome by maintaining a positive confession of God's promises in the face of all apparent evidence to the contrary." Effectively Hobart Freeman had come to advocate faith in "faith", not faith in God.

== Controversy ==
From the beginning, Freeman's congregation was the subject of controversy.

At a meeting of the County Board of Health on October 23, 1974, Barbara Clouse, the Health Nurse for Kosciusko County was concerned that the Glory Barn was a major health problem and it would only get worse. She detailed her concerns, saying that:

Diabetics were not taking their insulin and pregnant women were receiving no pre-natal or post-natal care. ... They are laying dead babies and live babies next to each other on the altars and praying over them to get the live babies to bring life back to the dead ones. There was one woman in our county praying over a baby for four days before the funeral home got hold of it.

Clouse's concerns were later supported by local hospital statistics for 1975/6, which suggested that women from the congregation who gave birth at home were over 60 times more likely to die than those who gave birth at hospital under medical supervision. Later assessment by the US Department of Health and Human Services supported this conclusion. Deaths of several women, infants and babies were reported, and the local media blamed Freeman's teachings as medical treatment had been declined or refused.

Deaths continued to be reported to the frustration of county law enforcement officials.

Shortly after they were publicized, the old Glory Barn burnt down in the early hours of July 4, 1980. Six people escaped from the burning two-story barn. Two youngsters, Joel and Lee, suffered burns before they were rescued from their bedrooms by their father Brendan Wahl. The boys' mother, Peggy Wahl (née Nusbaum), also claims to have been involved in their rescue, along with their daughter Penny who was not injured. Fire brigades from North Webster, Syracuse and Cromwell fought the blaze for some two hours until dawn, and the fire was subsequently investigated by the Noble County Police and Indiana State Fire Marshal. North Webster fire officials described the fire as of "suspicious origin". To date no culprit has been charged.

In May 1983, the Chicago Tribune ran a story on David Gilmore whose 15-month-old son, Dustin Graham, had died five years previously from an easily treatable form of meningitis. Following church teaching, Gilmore and his wife had relied solely on prayer for their son's healing. Gilmore said he knew of twelve other children who had died under similar circumstances. The Tribune further identified fifty-two deaths from Indiana, Illinois, Michigan, Ohio and Kentucky which, they asserted, were attributable to church teaching. A few months later, ABC television's Nightline reported that pregnant women following church teaching died at a rate eight times the national average and their children at three times. Nightline further identified nineteen states and five countries where deaths had occurred which, they asserted, were attributable to church teaching.

Eventually, Hobart Freeman was charged with aiding and abetting one of these deaths by what was described as "negligent homicide". At least ninety members of the congregation died during Freeman's ministry, which Daniel McConnell described as tragic and preventable.

== Death ==
Two weeks before this matter was to come to court, Freeman died at his Shoe Lake home of bronchial pneumonia and congestive heart failure complicated by an ulcerated gangrenous leg, which in the weeks preceding had forced him to preach sitting down. He had refused all medical help, even to the removal of the bandages so his leg could be cleaned.

Previously in Faith for Healing, Freeman had said that "To claim healing for the body and then to continue to take medicine is not following our faith with corresponding action ... When genuine faith is present, it alone will be sufficient for it will take the place of medicines and other aids."

Freeman's death was not reported for at least 13 hours due to an all-night prayer vigil for his resurrection. He was buried in a pine box with no public viewing and no graveside or memorial service. For some time afterwards, his wife, June Freeman (d. January 29, 2000), left his suit over the end of the bed, expecting him to one day walk in and have need of it. She soon came to accept his death as the will of God, and encouraged the congregation to persist in their faith.

== Legacy ==
In June 1985, Jack Farrell, one of the two assistant pastors hand-picked by Hobart Freeman, quit the congregation, telling "The Body" during the Sunday sermon, that they were still "in bondage" to their late pastor. Some of the congregation also grew disillusioned and left.

Others remained under the ministry of one or more of Freeman's successors. These successors included Jim and Joe Brenneman (d. July 20, 2024), Steve Hill, Jerry Ervin, Bruce Kinsey (d. June 14, 2008), Jim Mansfield, Gary Wilson, Terry Knafel, Jim Trout, Ron Moerchen, Don Mishler, Joe Duncan, Stan Hill, Tom Hamilton (d. April 7, 2015), Jim Oswalt, Dave Hardy, Harry Albright, Bill Garner, Jerry Reeder, Mark Yotter, Rick McCleay, Jeff Barnett and Tim Neely (d. August 25, 2025).

Not all were generally acknowledged to be faithful to Freeman's ministry.

In March 2015, Joshua Wilson, son of former Faith Assembly members, and Jack Pennington, a freelance filmmaker from Winston-Salem NC, announced their plans to film a documentary they called Children of Faith Assembly, which was promoted on the blog Friendly Atheist. However it was never produced.

== Publications ==
Freeman was the author of two books published by Moody Press of Chicago:

- An Introduction to the Old Testament Prophets [1969]
- Nahum Zephaniah Habakkuk: Minor Prophets in the Seventh Century [1973]

He later published another fourteen books through his own publishing house, Faith Publications of Warsaw, Indiana, later to become Faith Ministries and Publications:

- Angels of Light? Deliverance from Occult Oppression.
- Biblical Thinking and Confession: The Key to Victorious Living 365 Days a Year – This is a modified edition of the earlier Positive Thinking and Confession: The Key to Victorious Living 365 Days a Year.
- Charismatic Body Ministry: A Guide to the Restoration of Charismatic Ministry and Worship.
- Deeper Life in the Spirit [1970].
- Did Jesus Die Spiritually? Exposing the JDS Heresy.
- Divine Sovereignty / Human Freedom and Responsibility in Prophetic Thought – Master's degree thesis.
- Every Wind of Doctrine.
- Exploring Biblical Theology: A Systematic Study of the Word of God in Understandable Language [1985] – Published posthumously.
- Faith for Healing.
- How to Know God's Will – For Your Life and for Important Decisions.
- Why Speak in Tongues? The Christian's Three-Fold Ministry through Prayer in the Spirit.
- The Doctrine of Substitution in the Old Testament: Fulfilled in Christ [1985] – Based on his doctoral thesis and published posthumously.
- Why Do the Righteous Suffer? – Collated from his teaching tapes and published posthumously.
- The Sabbath in Relation to Law and Grace – Collated from his teaching tapes and published posthumously.

Two tracts:

- Occult Oppression and Bondage: How to be Free.
- The Purpose of Pentecost.

And over eleven hundred teaching tapes.

== Sources ==
- Faith Ministries and Publications
- Faith Assembly
- Feedback regarding Dr. Freeman and Faith Assembly
- Freeman, Hobart E., p316 in Dictionary of Pentecostal and Charismatic Movements, edited by Stanley M Burgess, Gary B McGee and Patrick H Alexander, Zondervan, Grand Rapids, Michigan 1988
- A Different Gospel – A Historical and Biblical Analysis of the Modern Faith Movement by Daniel Ray McConnell, Hendrickson Publishers, Peabody, Massachusetts 1988
- The Health and Wealth Gospel by Bruce Barron, Inter-Varsity Press, Downers Grove, Illinois 1987
- Never Far From Home by Cindy Barnett, Selah Publishing Group, Surprise, Arizona 2005
- The Doctrine of Substitution in the Old Testament by Hobart Edward Freeman, Th.D. Thesis, Grace Theological Seminary, Winona Lake IN, 1961
- Charismatic Chaos by John F. MacArthur, Zondervan, Grand Rapids, Michigan 1992, pp237–238
- Epidemiologic Notes and Reports Perinatal and Maternal Mortality in a Religious Group – Indiana by Anon, Morbidity and Mortality Weekly Report (June 1, 1984), 33(21):297–298.
- Children of FA – Facebook Group, accessed February 2, 2008.
- The Faith Assembly: A Study of Perinatal and Maternal Mortality by C. Spence, T.S. Danielson & A.M. Kaunitz, Indiana Medicine – J Indiana State Med Assoc (1984), 77:180–183.
- Maternal Mortality in Indiana: A Report of Maternal Deaths in 1979 by W.D. Ragan, Indiana Medicine – J Indiana State Med Assoc (1981), 74:565.
- Hobart Freeman: Mystic, Monk or Minister by John J. Davis, Times-Union Warsaw, Indiana 1983.
- Faith Assembly: Haven of Rest or House of Fear? by John J. Davis, Times-Union Warsaw, Indiana 1983.
- Inspiration For Living or Invitation To Death? by John J. Davis, Times-Union Warsaw, Indiana 1983.
- Faith Assembly: A Look Into The Future by John J. Davis, Times-Union Warsaw, Indiana 1983.
