= Leesburg =

Leesburg may refer to several locations in the United States of America:

- Leesburg, Alabama
- Leesburg, Florida
- Leesburg, Georgia
- Leesburg, Idaho, a community and historic district listed on the NRHP in Lemhi County, Idaho
- Leesburg, Illinois
- Leesburg, Indiana
  - Leesburg Historic District (Leesburg, Indiana), listed on the NRHP in Kosciusko County, Indiana
- Leesburg, Kentucky
- Leesburg, Mississippi
- Leesburg, New Jersey
- Leesburg, Ohio
- Leesburg, Texas
- Leesburg, Virginia
  - Leesburg Historic District (Leesburg, Virginia), NRHP-listed

== See also ==
- Leesburg Historic District (disambiguation)
