= Pretty Lake =

Pretty Lake may refer to:

- Pretty Lake, fictional town in Between (TV series)
- Pretty Lake, on List of lakes in Indiana
