= Leasburg =

Leasburg is the name of some places in the United States of America:

- Leasburg, Missouri
- Leasburg, New Mexico
- Leasburg, North Carolina

== See also ==
- Leesburg (disambiguation)
