= Glastex =

The Glastex Company, founded in Tinley Park, Illinois, produced a range of fiberglass products including fiberglass fibers for industrial use. Beginning in 1953, Glastex began to manufacture fiberglass boats, making it one of the earliest builders of molded fiberglass boats in the United States. From 1953 to 1962, Glastex built "Speed Queen" boats.

Glastex Company president and founder, William J. Horvath, expanded the company to a 47,000-square-foot (4,400 m^{2}) facility in Monmouth, Illinois after an early-1958 zoning dispute regarding manufacturing use of the 7-acre (28,000 m^{2}) property and the 9,000-square-foot (840 m^{2}) building located there. In 1958, Glastex employed twenty-two people and produced on average six boats a day before expanding to Monmouth later that year. Felt Enterprises bought the Glastex Company in 1961. The Monmouth, Illinois facility began building Sea Star Boats in 1968 and continued until 1981. Reorganized in 1982, Felt Enterprises built Mach I Boats until 1991. In 1993, the company was reorganized again and was known as Envision Boats, Inc. which operated until 2009.

== Speed Queen Boats ==
Speed Queen Boats were manufactured from 1953 to 1962. The first model was designed by company founder William J. Horvath. Fourteen feet in length, the first model was a centerdeck-style, all fiberglass runabout that could accept outboard motors up to 50 hp (37 kW). Additional sixteen and eighteen-foot models were added in 1958 and 1959.

== Sea Sprite Boats ==
Sea Sprite Boats were built for a marine dealer in North Webster, Indiana by the Bee Boat Company of Paxton, Illinois beginning in 1962. Overwhelmed by several contracts, the production of Sea Sprite Boats was contracted to the Glastex Company of Monmouth, Illinois. In 1968, Melvin Redeker, formerly of the Bee Boat Company, bought Sea Sprite and moved production to Crescent City, Illinois, operating as the Sea Sprite Boat Company in 1969. The Sea Sprite Boat Co. eventually became known as United Marine Corporation and was based in Watseka, Illinois. Melvin Redeker sold in 1984 to Robert F. Smith and a fire gutted the factory in 1990 which along with bankruptcy, led to the end of production of Sea Sprite Boats. I have a 1998 Sea Sprite so the company did not stop production in 1990

== Sea Star Boats ==
Ohio Marine of Minerva, Ohio marketed Sea Star Boats before the brand was taken over by the Glastex Company sometime around 1968. Production in Monmouth, Illinois continued until 1981.

== Ski Star Snowmobiles ==
Glastex manufactured Ski Star snowmobiles for the 1971 and 1972 model years, with Kohler engines in choices of a 292 single cylinder or a 440 twin cylinder model. There is a strong resemblance and some common part sharing between the Ski Star models and the Boatel Grand Prix models made in Mora, MN.
