= Bell Rohr Park, Indiana =

- Unincorporated community
- Location within Indiana Location within the United States
- Coordinates: 41°19′54″N 85°46′52″W
- Country: United States
- State: Indiana
- County: Kosciusko
- Township: Plain
- Elevation: 840 ft (260 m)
- Time zone: UTC-5 (Eastern (EST))
  - Summer (DST): UTC-4 (EDT)
- ZIP code: 46538
- GNIS feature ID: 430769

Bell Rohr Park is an unincorporated community in Plain Township, Kosciusko County, in the U.S. state of Indiana.

== Geography ==
Bell Rohr Park is located on the shores of Tippecanoe Lake.
