= Dixie (sternwheeler) =

Historic ship in Indiana, United States

- DIXIE (sternwheeler)
- U.S. National Register of Historic Places
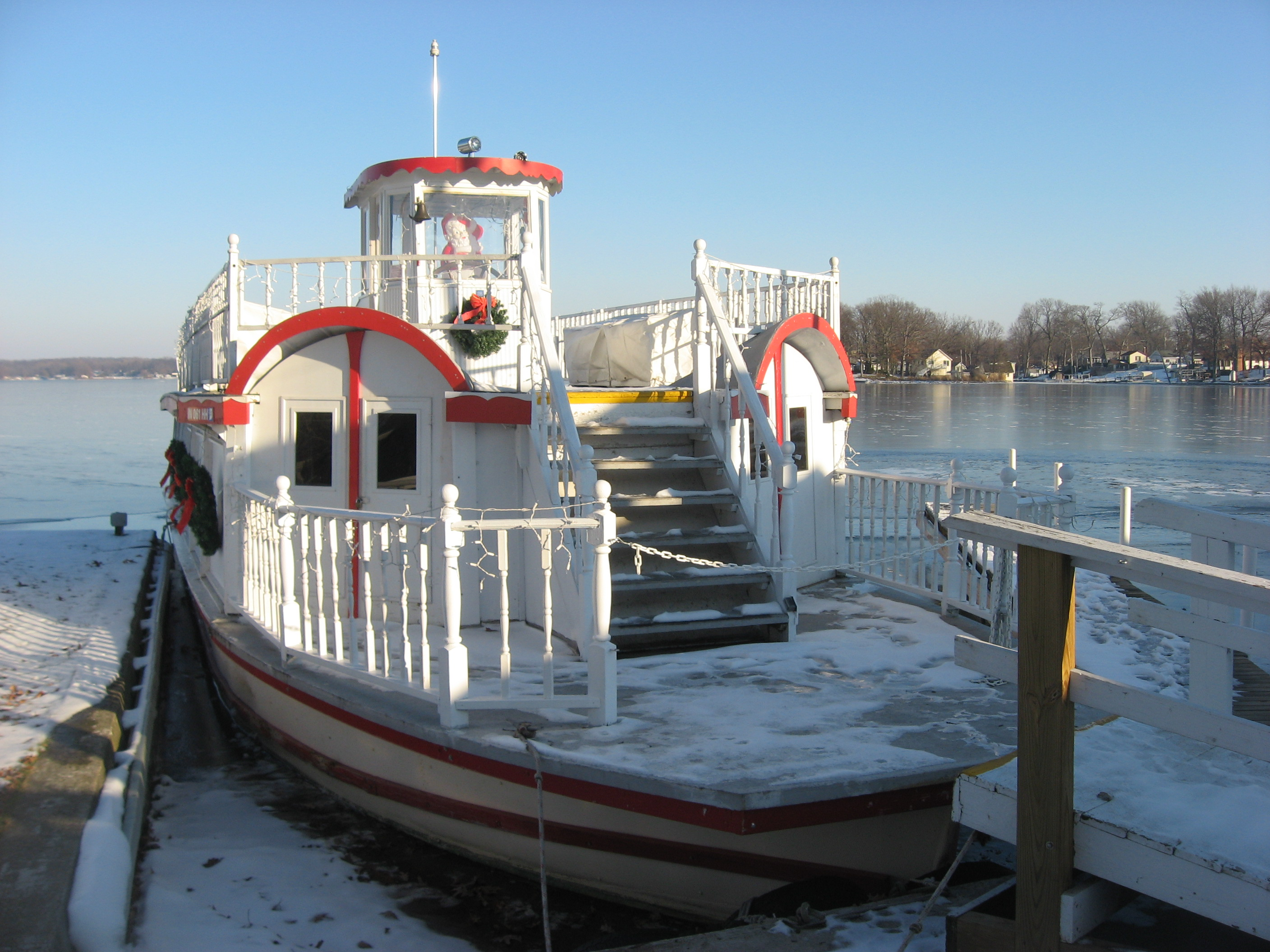
- Dixie at Webster Lake, January 2013

- Location within Indiana Location within the United States
- Location: 400 Blk. of S. Dixie Dr., North Webster, Indiana
- Coordinates: 41°19′23″N 85°41′35″W
- Area: less than one acre
- Built: 1928-1929
- Built by: Barbour Metal Boat Works, St. Louis, MO; Breeck, Joseph
- Architectural style: Stern wheel ship
- NRHP reference No.: 09000757
- Added to NRHP: September 24, 2009

Dixie, also known as New Dixie, is a historic sternwheeler located on Webster Lake at North Webster, Indiana. She was built in 1928–1929, and is a steel-hulled, diesel-electric powered passenger ship. She was modified substantially in 1950.

It was added to the National Register of Historic Places in 2009.

== See also ==
- National Register of Historic Places listings in Kosciusko County, Indiana
- Moro Bay ferry: Arkansas ship also made by the Barbour Metal Boat Works
