= Monoquet (Potawatomi chief) =

Native American chief (c. 1775 – 1836)

- Menoga / Menoquet
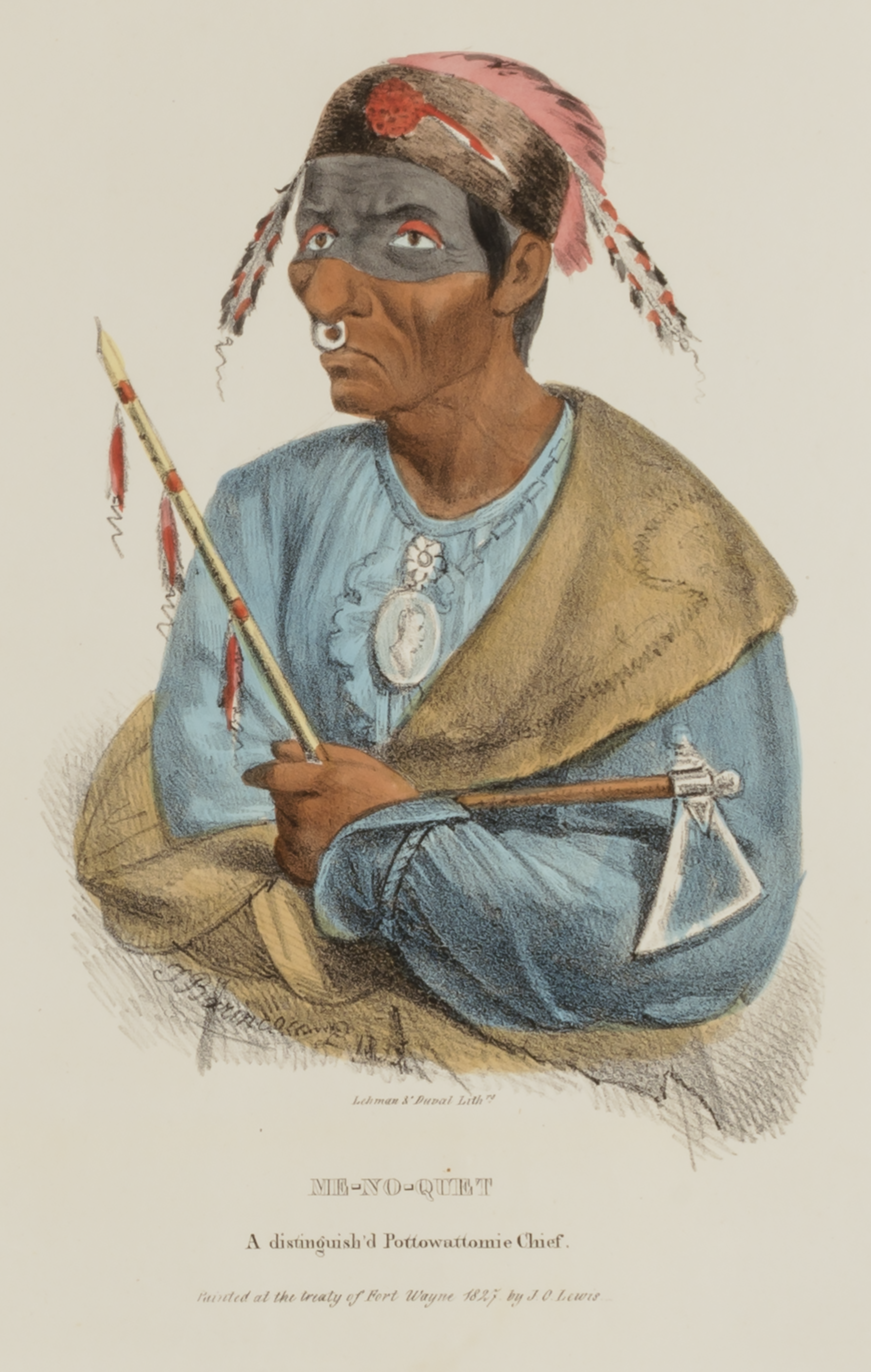
- 1835 illustration of Monoquet

Potawatomi leader
- Preceded by: Unknown (regional tribal leadership)
- Succeeded by: Likely his son (Jim Monoquet)

Personal details
- Born: c. 1775 Great Lakes region (likely Michigan Territory)
- Died: 1836 Monoquet Village, Kosciusko County, Indiana
- Resting place: Unknown (traditional Potawatomi burial)
- Relations: Allied with regional Potawatomi chiefs (Musquawbuck, Mota)
- Children: At least one son (Jim Monoquet)
- Known for: Resistance to forced removal; defense of tribal sovereignty; mysterious death

Military service
- Battles/wars: Battle of Tippecanoe (1811)

Monoquet (c. 1775 – 1836) was a Potawatomi chief in the early 19th century who led a band in what is now Kosciusko County, Indiana. He and his ancestors had been gradually displaced from their ancestral lands in the Great Lakes region by encroaching white settlements, including those in Michigan, contributing to their relocation into the Indiana Territory. As a leader, Monoquet fiercely resisted further displacement; he harbored deep mistrust of white settlers and worked tirelessly to maintain his tribe's autonomy longer than many other Native leaders of his era.

He died under mysterious circumstances in 1836, amid rumors that he was poisoned, which tribal members believed was done to eliminate him as an obstacle to Potawatomi removal. Shortly after his death, U.S. authorities forced the remaining Potawatomi, including Monoquet's band, to relinquish their land and move west to Kansas Territory. His legacy endures through place-names—most notably Monoquet, Indiana, near his former village site.

== Early life and background ==
Monoquet was born circa 1775 to Potawatomi parents, likely in the broader Great Lakes region. His people originally lived in Lower Michigan and the Old Northwest. Potawatomi American expansion and treaties forced many Potawatomi from their homelands in the early 1800s, pushing Monoquet's family into northern Indiana along the Tippecanoe River. The Treaty of Tippecanoe (1832) granted Monoquet's band temporary reservation land, approximately 2,560 acres, between present-day Leesburg and Warsaw, Indiana.

Monoquet earned renown as a warrior, reportedly fighting under Shawnee leader Tecumseh at the Battle of Tippecanoe in 1811. Contemporary accounts describe him as physically imposing—above average size, broad-shouldered, solemn, reserved, and shrewd.

== Leadership and resistance ==
By the early 1830s, Monoquet was recognized as the most influential Potawatomi chief in the area. He led about 15 wigwams along the north bank of the Tippecanoe River, near what is now State Road 15 and Monoquet Road. Historian Otho Winger noted Monoquet never reconciled with the white takeover of his people's lands and remained defiantly distrustful of American intentions. His cautious, resilient leadership enabled his band to retain autonomy longer than many other tribes, as he avoided treaty negotiations and resisted relocation.

== Village and community ==
Monoquet's village, known as the "Monoquet Reserve," was strategically located in dense forest and wetlands, comprising about 2–3 acres. It provided protection and abundant natural resources, delaying significant settler intrusion. The village maintained traditional customs, and visitors described it as orderly yet wary of outsiders.

== Death and controversy ==
Monoquet died suddenly in spring 1836, days after a celebration in his village. A young Potawatomi woman from Michigan who visited during the event was suspected of poisoning him. Though a doctor attributed his death to "lung fever," tribe members believed strongly in foul play. The woman fled, was pursued and killed by Monoquet's warriors, who blamed white settlers indirectly for their chief's demise.

Another source states the natives claimed he was poisoned by a daughter of the famous Indian chief, Tecumseh, for refusing to join him in the war against the whites.

Local lore claims the Potawatomi believed his death was politically motivated, possibly orchestrated by local officials. However, no definitive proof has ever confirmed these suspicions. Monoquet's burial followed traditional Potawatomi customs, but settlers reportedly desecrated his grave, scattering his remains to hasten tribal departure.

== Aftermath ==
Monoquet's death accelerated the forced relocation process. By 1838, U.S. forces conducted the brutal Potawatomi Trail of Death, removing over 850 Potawatomi people to Kansas. Around 40 perished en route from illness and harsh conditions. Monoquet's son reportedly led the survivors to Kansas Territory, where they became part of the Prairie Band and Citizen Potawatomi communities.

== Legacy ==
Monoquet's legacy remains prominent in local history and landmarks, such as the community of Monoquet, Indiana. His story symbolizes Native resilience, leadership, and the tragic history of forced removals. Annual historical exhibits, such as those hosted by the Kosciusko County Old Jail Museum, highlight his role in regional history.

In 2013, a commemorative Trail of Death caravan acknowledged historical sites, including the area near Monoquet's former village, underscoring his lasting significance to Potawatomi descendants.

Chief Monoquet is remembered for his defiant stand against removal and his lasting impact on Indiana's historical narrative.
