= Nyona Lake, Indiana =

- Census-designated place
- Location within Indiana Location within the United States
- Coordinates: 40°57′50″N 86°11′09″W
- Country: United States
- State: Indiana
- County: Fulton
- Township: Liberty

Area
  - Total: 0.54 sq mi (1.4 km^{2})
  - Land: 0.38 sq mi (0.98 km^{2})
  - Water: 0.16 sq mi (0.41 km^{2})
- Elevation: 794 ft (242 m)
- Time zone: UTC-5 (Eastern (EST))
  - Summer (DST): UTC-4 (EDT)
- ZIP code: 46951 (Macy)
- Area code: 574
- FIPS code: 18-55512
- GNIS feature ID: 2830383

Nyona Lake is an unincorporated community and census-designated place (CDP) in Fulton County, Indiana, United States.

== Geography ==
The community is in southeastern Fulton County, surrounding the natural water body of Nyona Lake. It is 9 miles (14 km) south of Rochester, the county seat.

According to the United States Census Bureau, the CDP has a total area of 0.54 square miles (1.40 km^{2}), of which 0.38 square miles (0.98 km^{2}) are land and 0.16 square miles (0.41 km^{2}), or 29.72%, are water. The lake drains at its south end into Mud Creek, which flows northwest to the Tippecanoe River, which continues west and then south to the Wabash River.

== Demographics ==
The United States Census Bureau defined Nyona Lake as a census designated place in the 2022 American Community Survey.
