= Lamb Lake =

- Location within Indiana Location within the United States
- Location: Johnson County, Indiana
- Coordinates: 39°21′33″N 86°10′54″W
- Type: reservoir
- Basin countries: United States
- Surface area: 260 acres (110 ha)
- Max. depth: 55 ft (17 m)
- Surface elevation: 755 feet (230 m)

Lamb Lake, Indiana is a 260 acres (110 ha) private lake located in Hensley Township in southwestern Johnson County, Indiana. It is home to many full-time residents as well as vacation and weekend homeowners.

Lamb Lake is the tied for the fourth largest private lake in Central/Southern Indiana with Sweetwater lake, behind Grandview Lake (300 acres (120 ha)) and Heritage Lake (318 acres (129 ha)), as measured by Google Maps. Its spillway feeds into the sixth highest waterfall in the state at 55 feet (17 m), just behind Little Clifty Falls (60 feet (18 m)), Big Clifty Falls (60 feet (18 m)), Hoffman Falls (78 feet (24 m)), Tunnel Falls (83 feet (25 m)) and Williamsport Falls (90 feet (27 m)). The lake is approximately 55 feet (17 m) at its deepest point.

The lake was completed in February 1967, is home to approximately 278 property owners, and is frequented by bald eagles, woodpeckers, swans, geese, ducks, many other birds, deer, foxes, raccoons and other wildlife. The lake has a private beach, a slalom ski course, and docks to rent for offshore landowners.

Watercraft have restrictions. No jet skis or jet boats are allowed on Lamb lake. Boats may have only one gas powered motor (including kicker motors). Pontoon boats may be no longer than 28.0 feet (8.5 m) in length. All other boats may be no longer than 21.0 feet (6.4 m) (excluding the longer bass boats) and no wider than 97 inches (2,500 mm) (excluding the majority of deep V bass boats that can also fish large bodies of water), and even some modified V bass boats like the BassTracker ProTeam 195 TXW. There is a 35 miles per hour (56 km/h) speed limit on the lake outside of the idle zones.

The lake has Crappie, largemouth bass, bluegill, hybrid striped bass, catfish, gizzard shad,and Walleye but the walleye is not very common. Crappie is considered by many to be the best fishing at Lamb Lake, followed by bass fishing, which rates below but near the benchmark southern Indiana average for relative weights.
