= Robert Orr Polygonal Barn =

Notable barn in northern Indiana, USA

- U.S. National Register of Historic Places
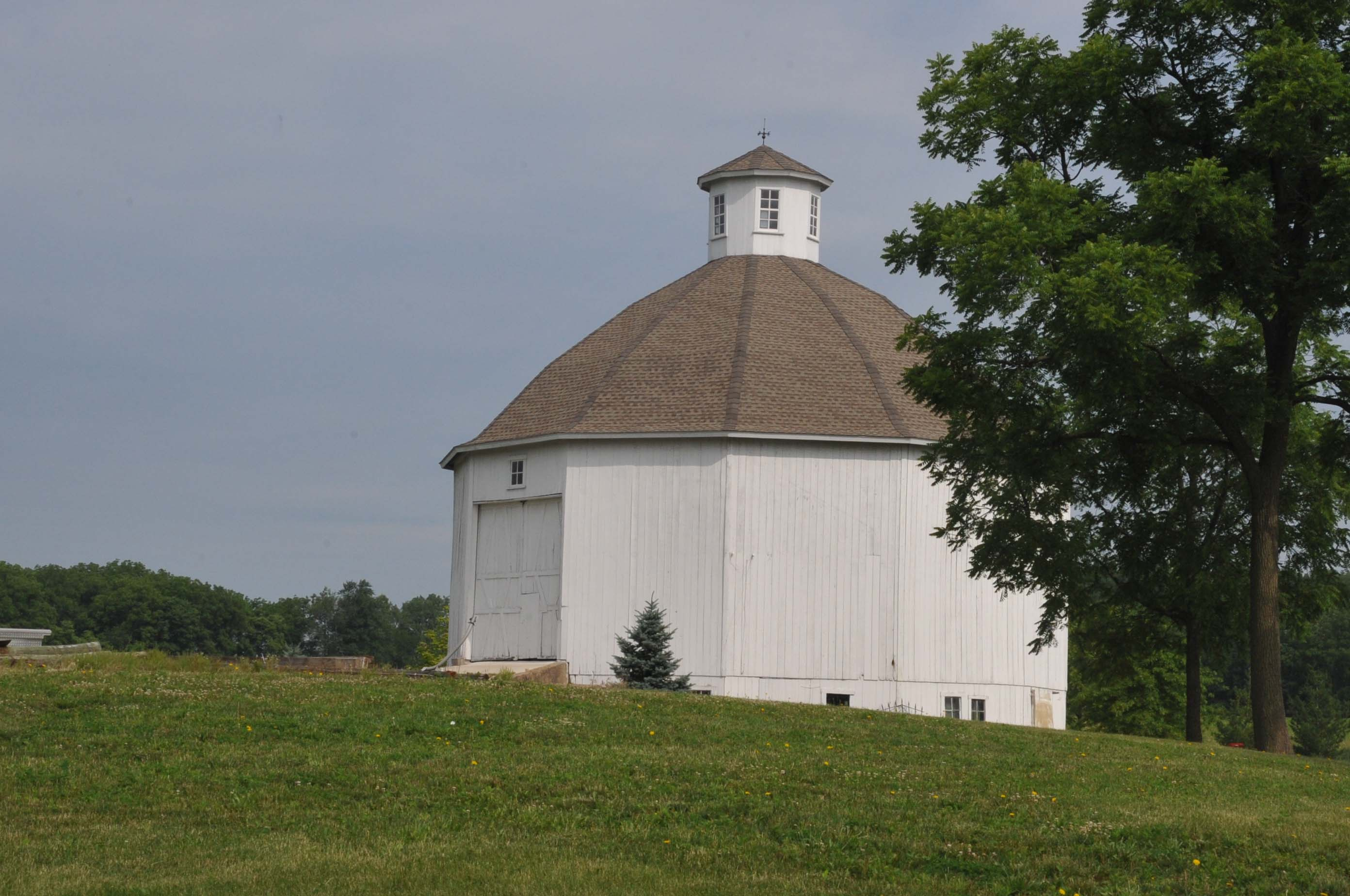
- Robert Orr Polygonal Barn, June 2013

- Location within Indiana Location within the United States
- Nearest city: State Road 13 south of North Webster, ½ mile north of its junction with Road 150 N, Plain Township, Kosciusko County, Indiana
- Coordinates: 41°15′43″N 85°42′12″W
- Area: less than one acre
- Built: 1911
- Built by: Makemson, Homer, et al.
- Architectural style: Twelve-sided barn
- MPS: Round and Polygonal Barns of Indiana MPS
- NRHP reference No.: 93000190
- Added to NRHP: April 2, 1993

Robert Orr Polygonal Barn, also known as the Oxenrider Barn, is a historic twelve-sided building located in Plain Township, Kosciusko County, Indiana. The frame barn has two stories and was built between 1909 and 1911. It is topped by a three-pitch gambrel roof and a twelve-sided cupola.

It was listed on the National Register of Historic Places in 1992.
