= OE 36 =

OE 36 is a class of 36 ft sailing yachts, designed in 1968 by Olle Enderlein (1917–1993), from whom the "OE" signature stems. The design is characteristic of the 1970s, with a distinct width at the middle of the hull, a narrow stern and bow, medium long fin keel and a skeg in front of the rudder.

A majority of the OE 36 yachts were co-built by the owners and professional boat builders at Sundsör Shipyard AB in Oxelösund, Sweden, where the builders rented the molds at the shipyard. As of 2008, the Swedish LYS handicap rating of the boat was 1.13.

== Specification ==
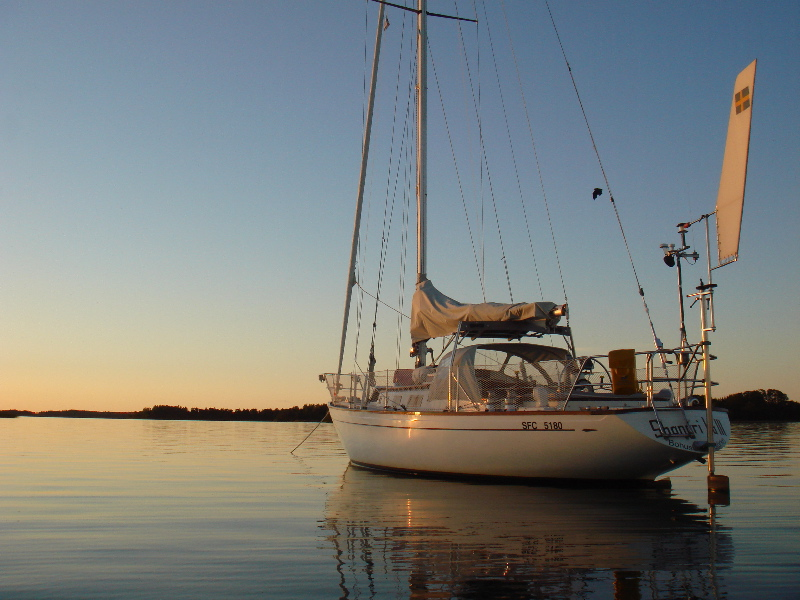
The OE 36 sailing yacht Shangri La III (1978), designed by Olle Enderlein.

- Length overall: 11.07 m
- Beam: 3.13 m
- Draft: 1.80 m
- Built: 1970-1983
- Designer: Olle Enderlein (1917–1993)
- Mainsail: 29.5 m^{2}
- Genoa: 42 m^{2}
- Spinnaker: 92 m^{2}
- Staysail: 15 m^{2}
- Weight: 5 800 kg
- Keel: Fin keel, lead
- Keel weight: 2 400 kg
- Total built: 150
- Years built: 1970-1983
- Construction material: Glass-reinforced plastic
