= Moro Bay State Park =

Park in Arkansas, USA

- Location within Arkansas Location within the United States
- Interactive map of Moro Bay State Park
- Location: Bradley County, Arkansas, United States
- Coordinates: 33°18′03″N 92°20′59″W
- Area: 117 acres (47 ha)
- Elevation: 269 feet (82 m)
- Established: 1972
- Administrator: Arkansas Department of Parks, Heritage and Tourism
- Website: Official website
- Arkansas State Parks
- Moro Bay ferry (towboat and barge)
- U.S. National Register of Historic Places
- Built: 1948
- Built by: Barbour Metal Boat Works
- NRHP reference No.: 100002944
- Added to NRHP: September 19, 2018

Moro Bay State Park is a public recreation area known for its fishing and water recreation at the convergence of Raymond Lake, Moro Bay, and the Ouachita River in Bradley County. The historic towboat and barge used as a ferry across the Ouachita River, Moro Bay ferry, is preserved at the park and listed on the National Register of Historic Places.

== History ==
The Dunbar and Hunter Expedition up the Ouachita River encountered "Bay Morau" on November 18, 1804. The area served as a landing when the Ouachita River was a primary transportation waterway between South Arkansas and New Orleans, Louisiana. It became a state park in 1972.

=== Moro Bay ferry ===
The Moro Bay ferry is a historic ferry site at Moro Bay State Park. A ferry operated across the Ouachita River at this site from 1828 until 1948 by private interests, and then again from 1965 to 1992 by the Arkansas Highway Department as part of Arkansas Highway 15, providing a major crossing point of the river in the immediate region. The towboat and barge used by the 1965-1992 ferry service are now set up as a display in the state park, with historically appropriate signage to its ferry slip. Because the area is prone to flooding, the boats are installed in a way that they will float when flooded. The boats were built in 1948 by the Barbour Metal Boat Works of St. Louis, and were probably the last ferry boats built for public service in the state. The ferry concluded service in 1992 following construction of bridges over the waterways; it is now included in the park exhibits. The boats were listed on the National Register of Historic Places in 2018.

== Location ==
Moro Bay State Park is located within the Piney Woods, and specifically within the Floodplains and Low Terraces, a Level IV EPA ecoregion. Nearly level and veneered by Holocene alluvium, this region contains natural Forested wetlands, levees, swales, oxbow lakes, and meander scars. Large parts of the ecoregion are frequently flooded. Active, meandering alluvial river channels are dynamic systems, with erosion and deposition reworking the topography of levees, ridges, and swales. Overbank flooding, subsurface groundwater, and local precipitation recharge water levels in backswamps, pools, sloughs, oxbows, and depressions of this floodplain region.

Potential natural vegetation is southern floodplain forest as in the Mississippi Alluvial Plain; it is unlike the oak–hickory–pine forest of the higher, better drained, and lithologically distinct Tertiary Uplands and Cretaceous Dissected Uplands. Water oak, willow oak, sweetgum, blackgum, American elm, red maple, Southern red oak, swamp chestnut oak, and loblolly pine are typical. On wet flats, backswamps, and swamp margins that are seasonally flooded, overcup oak, water hickory, water elm, sweetgum, green ash, and red maple occur. River banks may contain black willow, sycamore, and eastern cottonwood. Wetness and flooding present severe limitations for agriculture. A few of the higher terraces may have some pasture, but most of the region has deciduous forest land cover. Silviculture activities range from selective tree removal to clearcutting to, in some areas, replacement with pine monoculture. Reservoirs have inundated large areas of this habitat and have altered downstream hydrology. The bottomland forests provide important wildlife habitat with a high diversity of species.

== Activities and amenities ==
The park offers camping and picnicking sites, hiking trails, a marina with boat rentals, and a visitor center.

== See also ==
- National Register of Historic Places listings in Bradley County, Arkansas
- Dixie (sternwheeler): Indiana ship also made by the Barbour Metal Boat Works
