= Monoquet, Indiana =

- Unincorporated community
- Location within Indiana Location within the United States
- Coordinates: 41°17′22″N 85°51′42″W
- Country: United States
- State: Indiana
- County: Kosciusko
- Township: Plain
- Elevation: 846 ft (258 m)
- Time zone: UTC-5 (Eastern (EST))
  - Summer (DST): UTC-4 (EDT)
- ZIP code: 46582
- FIPS code: 18-50184
- GNIS feature ID: 439337

Monoquet is an unincorporated community in Plain Township, Kosciusko County, in the U.S. state of Indiana.

== History ==
Monoquet [muh-NUH-kwet] was laid out in 1834, later being founded in 1844 when a post office was established on January 29, 1844; closed on April 17, 1851.

The village was named after the Potawatomi Chief Monoquet of the Tippecanoe.
