= North Webster, Indiana =

- Town
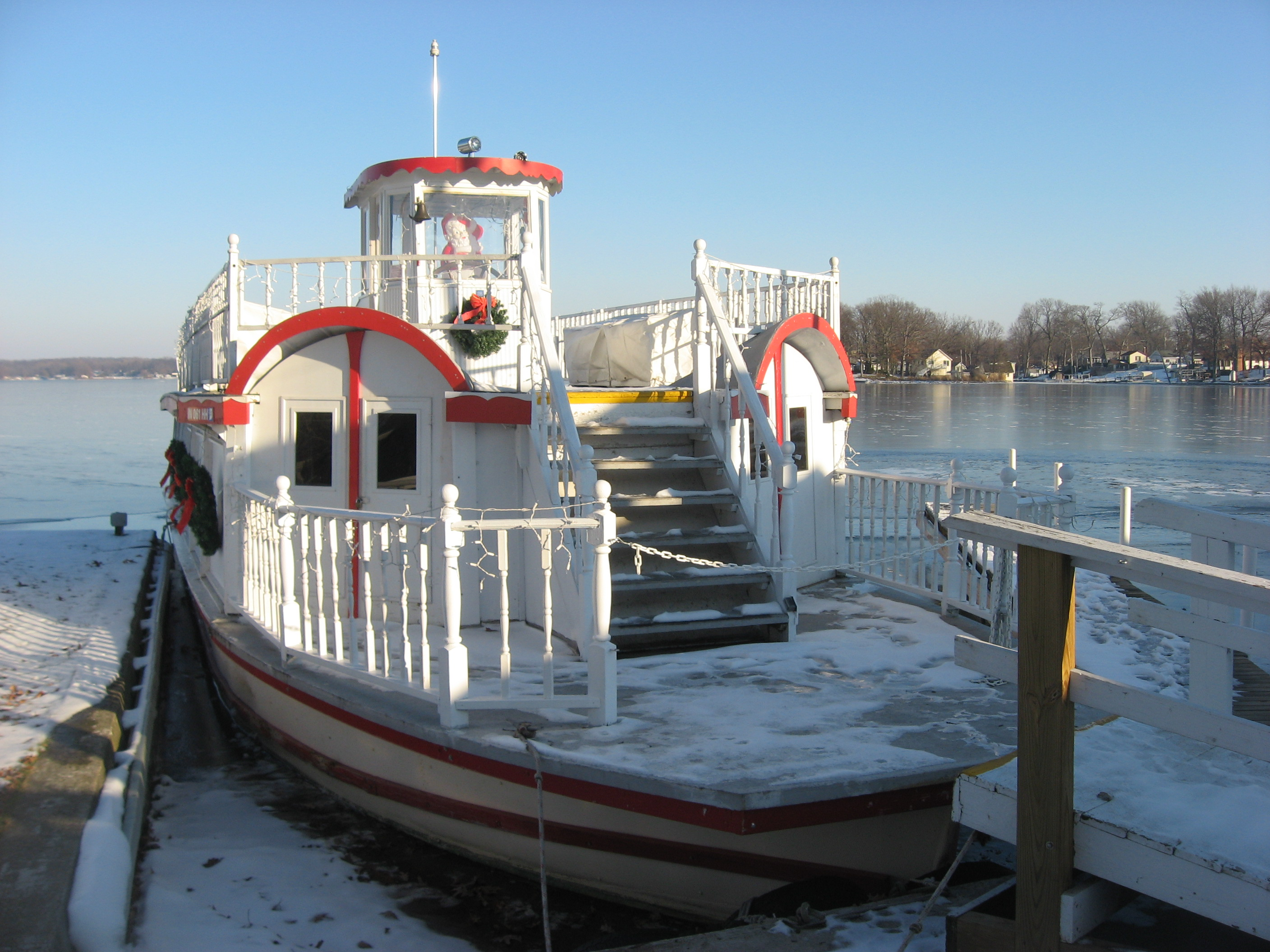
- Dixie, a Webster Lake boat

- Logo

- Location of North Webster in Kosciusko County, Indiana.
- Coordinates: 41°19′26″N 85°41′52″W
- Country: United States
- State: Indiana
- County: Kosciusko
- Township: Tippecanoe

Area
  - Total: 0.82 sq mi (2.13 km^{2})
  - Land: 0.81 sq mi (2.10 km^{2})
  - Water: 0.012 sq mi (0.03 km^{2})
- Elevation: 876 ft (267 m)

Population (2020)
  - Total: 998
  - Density: 1,232.7/sq mi (475.96/km^{2})
- Time zone: UTC-5 (Eastern (EST))
  - Summer (DST): UTC-4 (EDT)
- ZIP code: 46555
- Area code: 574
- FIPS code: 18-55134
- GNIS feature ID: 2396824
- Website: www.northwebster.com

North Webster is a town in Tippecanoe Township, Kosciusko County, in the U.S. state of Indiana. As of the 2020 census, North Webster had a population of 998. The National Weather Service operates a Weather Forecast Office North of town toward Syracuse.

== History ==
North Webster was platted in 1837, and named for Daniel Webster. The post office at North Webster has been in operation since 1879.

The Robert Orr Polygonal Barn was listed on the National Register of Historic Places in 1992.

== Geography ==
According to the 2010 census, North Webster has a total area of 0.82 square miles (2.12 km^{2}), of which 0.8 square miles (2.07 km^{2}) (or 97.56%) is land and 0.02 square miles (0.05 km^{2}) (or 2.44%) is water.

== Demographics ==
Historical population
Census	Pop.	Note	%±
1940	343		—
1950	487		42.0%
1960	494		1.4%
1970	456		−7.7%
1980	709		55.5%
1990	881		24.3%
2000	1,067		21.1%
2010	1,146		7.4%
2020	998		−12.9%
U.S. Decennial Census

=== 2010 census ===
As of the census of 2010, there were 1,146 people, 501 households, and 316 families living in the town. The population density was 1,432.5 inhabitants per square mile (553.1/km^{2}). There were 612 housing units at an average density of 765.0 per square mile (295.4/km^{2}). The racial makeup of the town was 96.3% White, 0.6% African American, 0.1% Native American, 0.3% Asian, 1.0% from other races, and 1.7% from two or more races. Hispanic or Latino of any race were 2.5% of the population.

There were 501 households, of which 27.9% had children under the age of 18 living with them, 47.1% were married couples living together, 10.2% had a female householder with no husband present, 5.8% had a male householder with no wife present, and 36.9% were non-families. 31.7% of all households were made up of individuals, and 16.4% had someone living alone who was 65 years of age or older. The average household size was 2.29 and the average family size was 2.85.

The median age in the town was 41.6 years. 21.4% of residents were under the age of 18; 6.3% were between the ages of 18 and 24; 26.6% were from 25 to 44; 27.4% were from 45 to 64; and 18.2% were 65 years of age or older. The gender makeup of the town was 48.3% male and 51.7% female.

=== 2000 census ===
As of the census of 2000, there were 1,067 people, 446 households, and 297 families living in the town. The population density was 1,488.0 inhabitants per square mile (574.5/km^{2}). There were 612 housing units at an average density of 853.5 per square mile (329.5/km^{2}). The racial makeup of the town was 97.84% White, 0.28% African American, 0.56% Native American, 0.09% Asian, 0.94% from other races, and 0.28% from two or more races. Hispanic or Latino of any race were 1.69% of the population.

There were 446 households, out of which 27.1% had children under the age of 18 living with them, 52.9% were married couples living together, 10.5% had a female householder with no husband present, and 33.4% were non-families. 27.6% of all households were made up of individuals, and 15.2% had someone living alone who was 65 years of age or older. The average household size was 2.35 and the average family size was 2.85.

In the town, the population was spread out, with 23.0% under the age of 18, 7.6% from 18 to 24, 27.5% from 25 to 44, 23.3% from 45 to 64, and 18.7% who were 65 years of age or older. The median age was 40 years. For every 100 females, there were 90.2 males. For every 100 females age 18 and over, there were 85.1 males.

The median income for a household in the town was $39,038, and the median income for a family was $46,094. Males had a median income of $36,406 versus $22,344 for females. The per capita income for the town was $18,824. About 3.8% of families and 6.5% of the population were below the poverty line, including 8.7% of those under age 18 and 8.4% of those age 65 or over.

== The Lakes ==
North Webster is situated in Indiana's lakes region. During the summertime the area is popular for boating and fishing. Inside the town of North Webster is Lake Webster.

=== Surrounding Lakes ===
- Dewart Lake
- Barbee Lake
- James Lake
- Lake Papakeechie
- Shoe Lake
- Syracuse Lake
- Tippecanoe Lake
- Lake Wawasee
- Webster Lake

== Education ==
The town has a lending library, the North Webster Community Public Library.

== Arts and culture ==
=== Mermaid Festival ===
Hosted by the North Webster Lions Club, the club's largest fundraiser of the year takes place during the last full week of June. The primary attractions of the festival are the Cutie King & Queen Pageant, the Cutie parade, and the Mermaid Parade itself. Aside from the carnival coming to town, a Festival parade takes place Saturday at 4 p.m. to celebrate the end of the festival. That night fireworks are set off to officially announce the end of the festival. In 2007, a laser light show was substituted for the fireworks and in 2008 there was a video slideshow. 2015 marked the 70th annual Mermaid Festival. The theme that year was 'Back to the 70s'.

=== Businesses ===
There are a few antique shops and bait shops, a CVS, a Dollar General and an Ace Hardware in town. There is a castle in the middle of town, previously home to International Palace of Sports.

In 1998, The National Weather Service merged its South Bend and Fort Wayne offices and planted an office in North Webster that serves Northern Indiana, SE Michigan and NW Ohio.

=== Attractions ===
North Webster is home to The Dixie, Indiana's oldest stern wheel paddle boat. The Dixie has cruised Webster Lake since 1929, providing tours of the lake to generations of residents and visitors. A number of private owners cared for and operated the boat from 1929 until 2007 when title was transferred to a 501(c)(3) not-for-profit corporation called Dixie Stern wheeler Inc. (DSI). DSI continues to operate the boat for regular summer cruises from Memorial Day weekend through Labor Day and to allow chartered events such as weddings, retirement home outings, and company and community gatherings. Regular cruises last about 75 minutes and are each evening Monday through Saturday and during the afternoon and evening on Sunday. Many of the regular cruises feature period music and a narration with some history of the area, the lake and The Dixie.
