= Napias Creek =

- Location of mouth

Location
- Country: United States
- State: Idaho

Physical characteristics
- Mouth
  - coordinates: 45°08′14″N 114°13′02″W

Napias Creek is a stream in the U.S. state of Idaho.

Napias Creek derives its name from a Native American word meaning "money".
