= Nyona Lake =

- Location within Indiana Location within the United States
- Location: Fulton County, Indiana, United States
- Coordinates: 40°57′54″N 86°11′05″W
- Type: Natural Lake
- Primary inflows: Whitmore Ditch (East, North Basin) Fouts Ditch (NW, North Basin)
- Primary outflows: Channel/Dam (SW, South Basin) Flows into Mud Creek
- Basin countries: United States
- Surface area: 104 acres (0.42 km^{2})
- Average depth: 13 ft (4.0 m)
- Max. depth: 32 ft (9.8 m)
- Residence time: 75% Population Yr. Round
- Surface elevation: 794 ft (242 m)

Nyona Lake is a lake near the town of Macy, Indiana, in Fulton County.

Originally known as North Mud Lake it was renamed for Nyona Shaffer, whose family operated a cabin rental business on the lakefront in the 1920s. Early investors in the lake's recreation business included Chevrolet founder Louis Chevrolet who operated a dancehall and refreshment stands.

The census-designated place of Nyona Lake surrounds the lake.
