= Leesburg, Idaho =

- Leesburg
- U.S. National Register of Historic Places
- U.S. Historic district
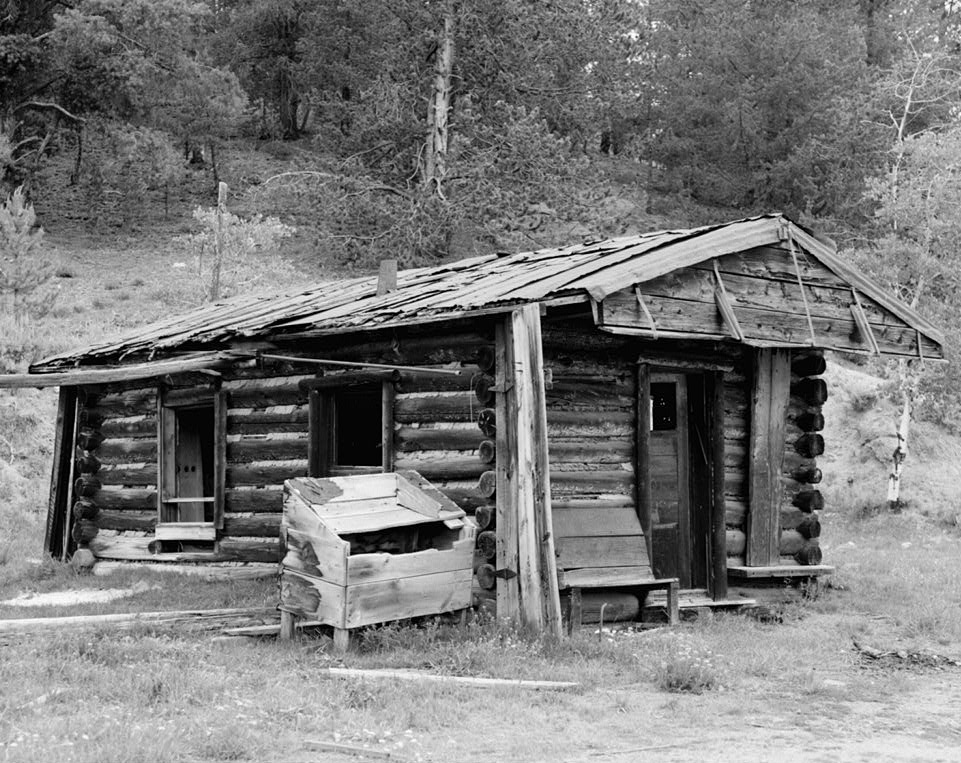
- Leesburg's old school

- Location within Idaho Location within the United States
- Location: Lemhi County, Idaho
- Nearest city: Salmon, Idaho
- Coordinates: 45°13′26″N 114°6′50″W
- Architectural style: Rocky Mountain
- NRHP reference No.: 75000634
- Added to NRHP: April 4, 1975

Leesburg is an unincorporated community in Lemhi County, Idaho, United States. It lies at 45°13′26″N 114°6′50″W, along Napias Creek in the Salmon National Forest, west of Salmon. Its altitude is 6,653 feet (2,028 m).

== History ==
Leesburg's population was 75 in 1909. The community possessed a post office as late as 1942, but it has since closed. Little remains of the original community. The entire site has been listed on the National Register of Historic Places since 1975.

== History ==
Leesburg was established after gold was discovered at the Leesburg Mine on July 16, 1866. The mining town was named for General Robert E. Lee because most of the settlers were Southerners. It once had a population of 7,000, including Chinese; 100 business firms; and a main street a mile long. Miners dug over 400 miles of ditches to carry water to sluice out gold. By 1930 placer mining was carried on nearly entirely by hydraulic methods. The mine produced nearly $16,000,000 in gold prior to 1938.
