= Lingle Creek =

Stream in Johnson County, Iowa, U.S.

Coordinates: 41.8386206°N 91.5590625°W

Lingle Creek is a stream in Johnson County, Iowa, in the United States. It is a tributary to Hoosier Creek.

Lingle Creek was named for Thomas Lingle, who operated a gristmill along the creek in the 1840s.

== See also ==
- List of rivers of Iowa
