= Knapp Lake =

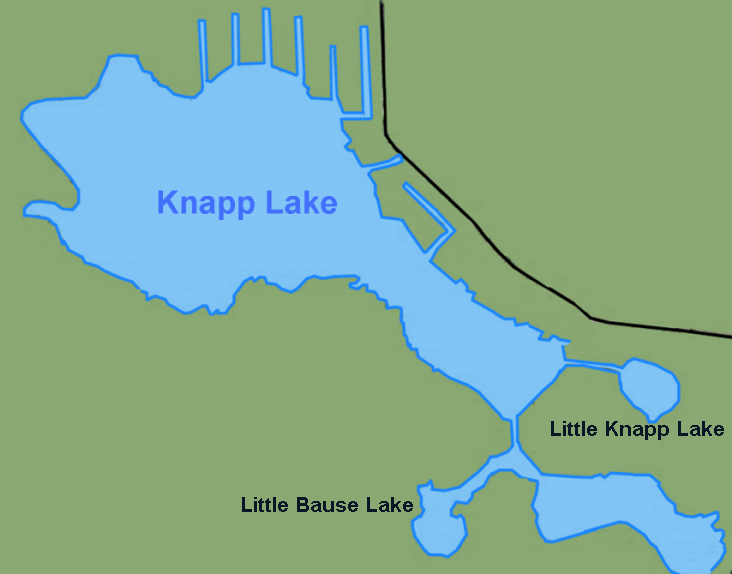

- Location within Indiana Location within the United States
- Location: Noble County, Indiana, United States
- Type: Glacier lake
- Primary inflows: Little Knapp Lake, Little Bause Lake
- Primary outflows: Papakeechie watershed
- Basin countries: United States
- Max. depth: 56 ft (17 m)
- Surface elevation: 876 ft (267 m)
- Islands: 0
- Settlements: 0

Knapp Lake is a small natural lake located in western Noble County, Indiana.

Knapp Lake is directly attached to Little Bause Lake via a channel and Little Knapp Lake on the south and southwest and Moss Lake to the north. Little Bause has development around its shores while Little Knapp is undeveloped. Harper Lake and Gilbert Lake, both undeveloped for the most part form the southern part of the Papakeechie watershed as it flows northward to Lake Wawasee through Moss Lake.

The southwest, northeast and north shores comprise the bulk of the homes on the lake. The north shore has five man-made channels. The northwest shore is forested. Farmland surrounds mostly the east and south beyond inhabited areas.

In 1999, with the assistance of the Indiana Department of Natural Resources, the Wawasee Property Owners Association purchased 13.52 acres (5.47 ha) of land and wetlands on Knapp Lake and 19.65 acres (7.95 ha) surrounding Little Knapp Lake.
