= Plain Township, Kosciusko County, Indiana =

Plain Township
- Township
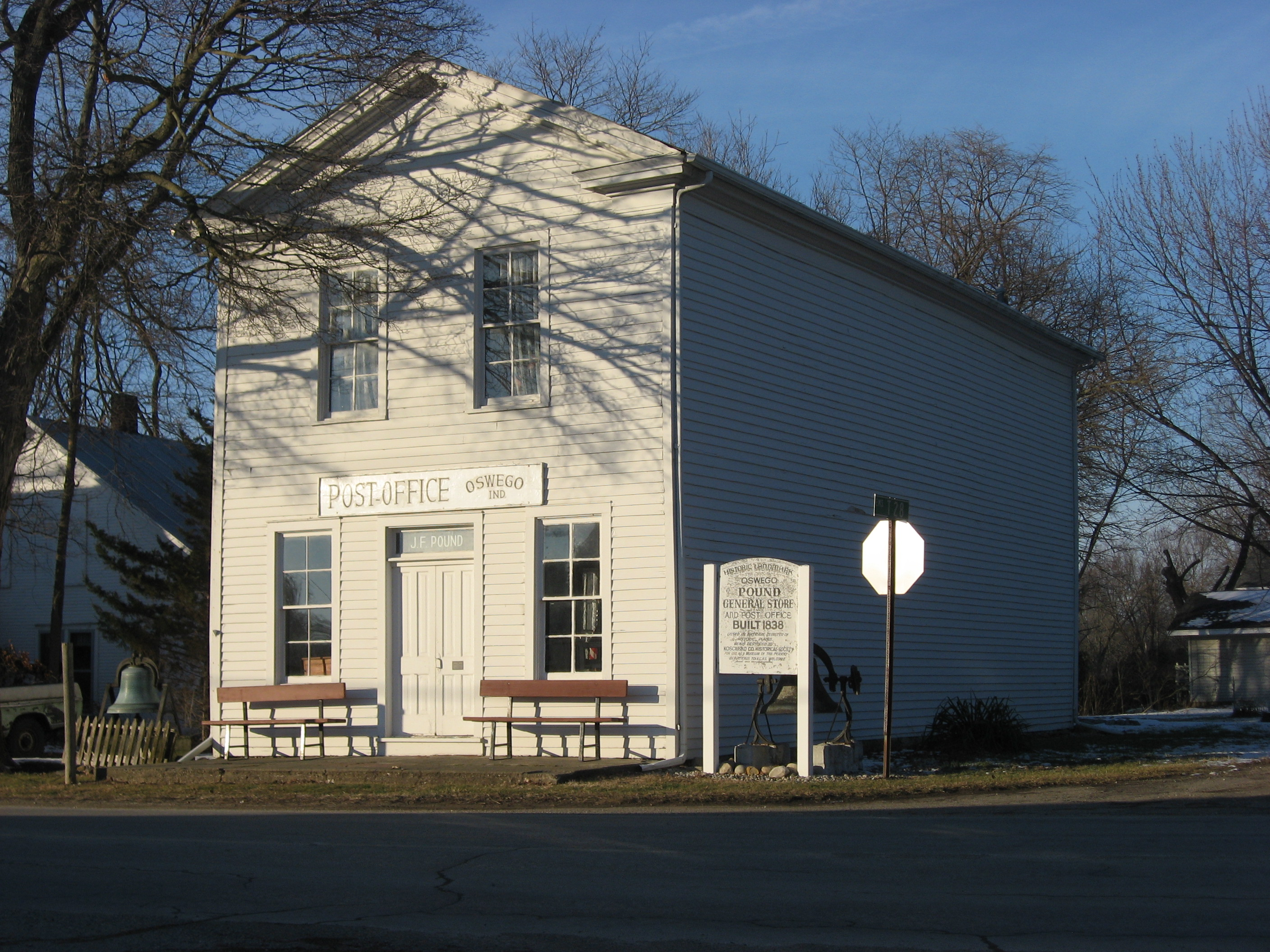
- The John Pound Store in Oswego

- Coordinates: 41°17′59″N 85°49′38″W
- Country: United States
- State: Indiana
- County: Kosciusko

Government
  - Type: Indiana township

Area
  - Total: 35.9 sq mi (93 km^{2})
  - Land: 33.93 sq mi (87.9 km^{2})
  - Water: 1.97 sq mi (5.1 km^{2})
- Elevation: 840 ft (256 m)

Population (2020)
  - Total: 8,819
  - Density: 226.9/sq mi (87.6/km^{2})
- Time zone: UTC-5 (Eastern (EST))
  - Summer (DST): UTC-4 (EDT)
- FIPS code: 18-60228
- GNIS feature ID: 453743

Plain Township is one of 17 townships in Kosciusko County, Indiana, United States. As of the 2020 census, its population was 8,819 (up from 7,698 at 2010) and it contained 4,129 housing units.

== History ==
The Robert Orr Polygonal Barn was listed on the National Register of Historic Places in 1992.

== Geography ==
According to the 2010 census, the township has a total area of 35.9 square miles (93 km^{2}), of which 33.93 square miles (87.9 km^{2}) (or 94.51%) is land and 1.97 square miles (5.1 km^{2}) (or 5.49%) is water.

=== Cities and towns ===
- Leesburg
- Warsaw (north side)

=== Unincorporated towns ===
- Bell Rohr Park at 41.3317128°N 85.7811007°W
- Monoquet at 41.2894896°N 85.8616588°W
- Osborn Landing at 41.2811563°N 85.7969341°W
- Oswego at 41.3203237°N 85.7872119°W
- Stoneburner Landing at 41.2850453°N 85.7766558°W

(This list is based on USGS data and may include former settlements.)

== Notable residents ==
- Chris Schenkel, former Sportscaster for ABC Sports. Resided in Leesburg.
