= Barbee Lake =

Lake in Indiana, United States

- Location within Indiana Location within the United States

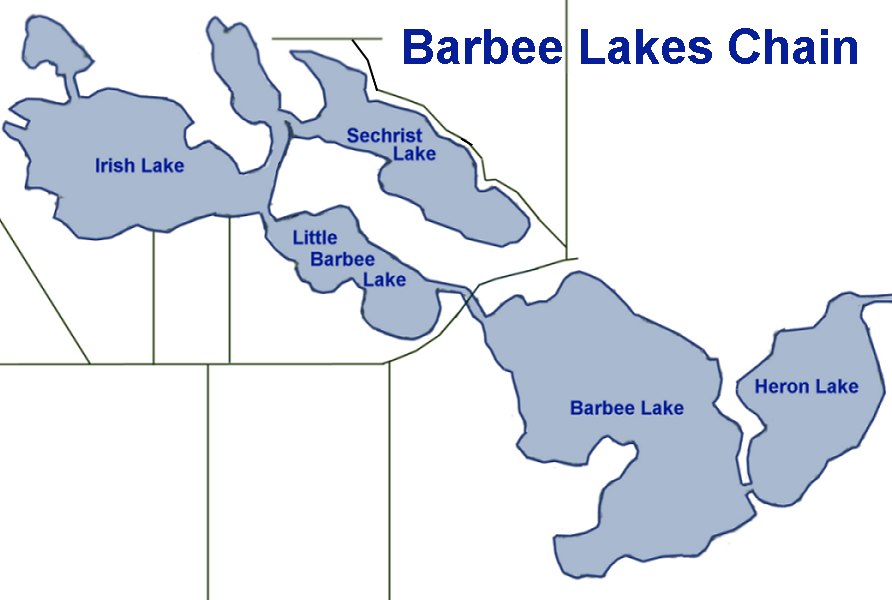
- Map of the Barbee chain of lakes
- Location: Warsaw, Kosciusko County, Indiana
- Coordinates: 41°17′06″N 85°42′12″W
- Primary inflows: Grassy Creek
- Primary outflows: into Tippecanoe Lake
- Basin countries: United States
- Surface area: 855 acres (346 ha)
- Average depth: 16 ft (4.9 m)
- Max. depth: 65 ft (20 m)
- Water volume: 4,749 acre⋅ft (5,858,000 m^{3})
- Surface elevation: 840 ft (260 m)
- Islands: 0
- Settlements: 0

Barbee Lake is a fresh water lake located in Warsaw, Indiana, United States.

The Barbee chain of lakes was formed by retreating glaciers during the Pleistocene era as were most of northeast Indiana's lakes.

== Location ==
The greater Barbee lakes are located just west of Indiana State Road 13, approximately 3 miles (4.8 km) south-southeast of Tippecanoe Lake and 5 miles (8.0 km) southwest of Webster Lake.

== The lake chain ==
Barbee Lake is composed of seven interconnected and natural lakes (Barbee Lakes chain):

- Barbee Lake 304 acres (123 ha)
- Little Barbee Lake 74 acres (30 ha)
- Kuhn Lake 137 acres (55 ha)
- Irish Lake 182 acres (74 ha)
- Sawmill Lake 36 acres (15 ha)
- Sechrist Lake 105 acres (42 ha)
- Banning Lake 17 acres (6.9 ha)

== Inflow and outflow ==
Inflow via Grassy Creek feeds Barbee (Big Barbee), Little Barbee, Irish, and Sawmill. Shoe Lake flows into Banning Lake while Heron Lake flows into Kuhn Lake. Banning and Kuhn Lakes have the best water quality in the chain because their small watersheds contribute fewer nutrients. Water leaving the Barbee chain heads north and feeds Tippecanoe Lake. Some 75% of the watershed is agricultural.

== Residential ==
The chain of Barbee lakes has approximately 2,300 residences spread throughout the lakes with the highest concentration near Barbee's north end, Sechrist, and Little Barbee Lake.

== Recreation ==
All of the lakes support bluegill, largemouth bass, yellow perch, catfish, and crappie. The Indiana Department of Natural Resources maintains a boat ramp on Kuhn Lake's north side. Access to Tippecanoe is possible for boats 16 feet (4.9 m) and shorter in length through a manually operated lock.
