= Saugany Lake, Indiana =

- Census-designated place
- Location within Indiana Location within the United States
- Coordinates: 41°43′17″N 86°35′35″W
- Country: United States
- State: Indiana
- County: LaPorte
- Townships: Galena, Hudson

Area
  - Total: 0.80 sq mi (2.1 km^{2})
  - Land: 0.70 sq mi (1.8 km^{2})
  - Water: 0.11 sq mi (0.28 km^{2})
- Elevation: 804 ft (245 m)
- Time zone: UTC-5 (Eastern (EST))
  - Summer (DST): UTC-4 (EDT)
- ZIP code: 46731 (Rolling Prairie)
- Area code: 219
- FIPS code: 18-68103
- GNIS feature ID: 2830444

Saugany Lake is an unincorporated community and census-designated place (CDP) in LaPorte County, Indiana, United States.

== Geography ==
The community is in northeastern LaPorte County, surrounding the natural water body of Saugany Lake. It is 5 miles (8 km) northeast of Rolling Prairie and 12 miles (19 km) northeast of La Porte, the county seat. The Indiana Toll Road (I-80 and I-90) forms the northern border of the community but provides no direct access, with the nearest interchange being Exit 49, 12 miles (19 km) to the southwest.

According to the U.S. Census Bureau, the Saugany Lake CDP has a total area of 0.80 square miles (2.07 km^{2}), of which 0.70 square miles (1.81 km^{2}) are land and 0.11 square miles (0.28 km^{2}), or 13.33%, are water. The lake has no surface outlet, with the nearest water body at a lower elevation being Hudson Lake, less than 1 mile (1.6 km) to the east.

== Demographics ==
Historical population
Census	Pop.	Note	%±
2023 (est.)	171

The United States Census Bureau defined Saugany Lake as a census designated place in the 2022 American Community Survey.
