= Webster Lake (Indiana) =

Lake in Kosciusko County, Indiana, United States

- Location within Indiana Location within the United States

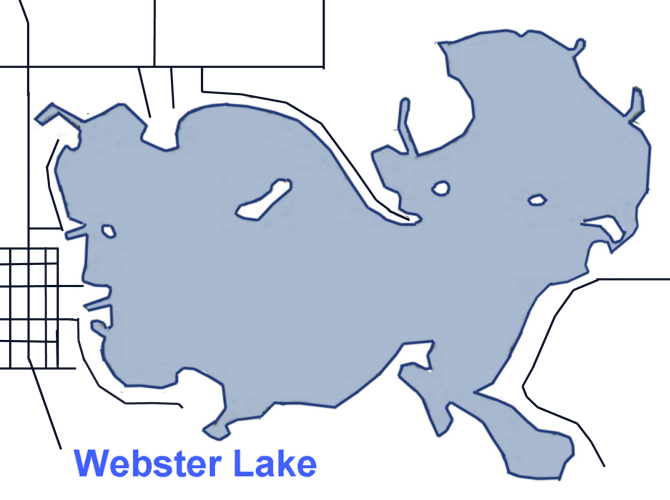
- map
- Location: Kosciusko County, North Central Indiana
- Group: Barbee lakes chain
- Coordinates: 41°19′29″N 085°40′55″W
- Primary inflows: Spring Fed
- Primary outflows: (into Blackwater Lake)
- Basin countries: United States
- Surface area: 640 acres (260 ha)
- Max. depth: 65 ft (20 m)
- Surface elevation: 856 ft (261 m)
- Dam: Webster Lake Dam
- Settlements: North Webster, Indiana

Lake Webster is a fresh water lake located in Kosciusko County, Indiana, United States. Formerly it was known as Boydston Lake. It borders the town of North Webster to the west of the lake.

== Geographic place names ==
- Big Island-Kline Island
- Backwater Lake is the body of water south of Webster Lake proper
- Dickerson's Point is located on the north shore
- Hayden's Point is the point of land before entering Webster Bay
- Ruple's Beach is located on the south shore
- Webster Bay
- Yellowbanks

== Attractions ==
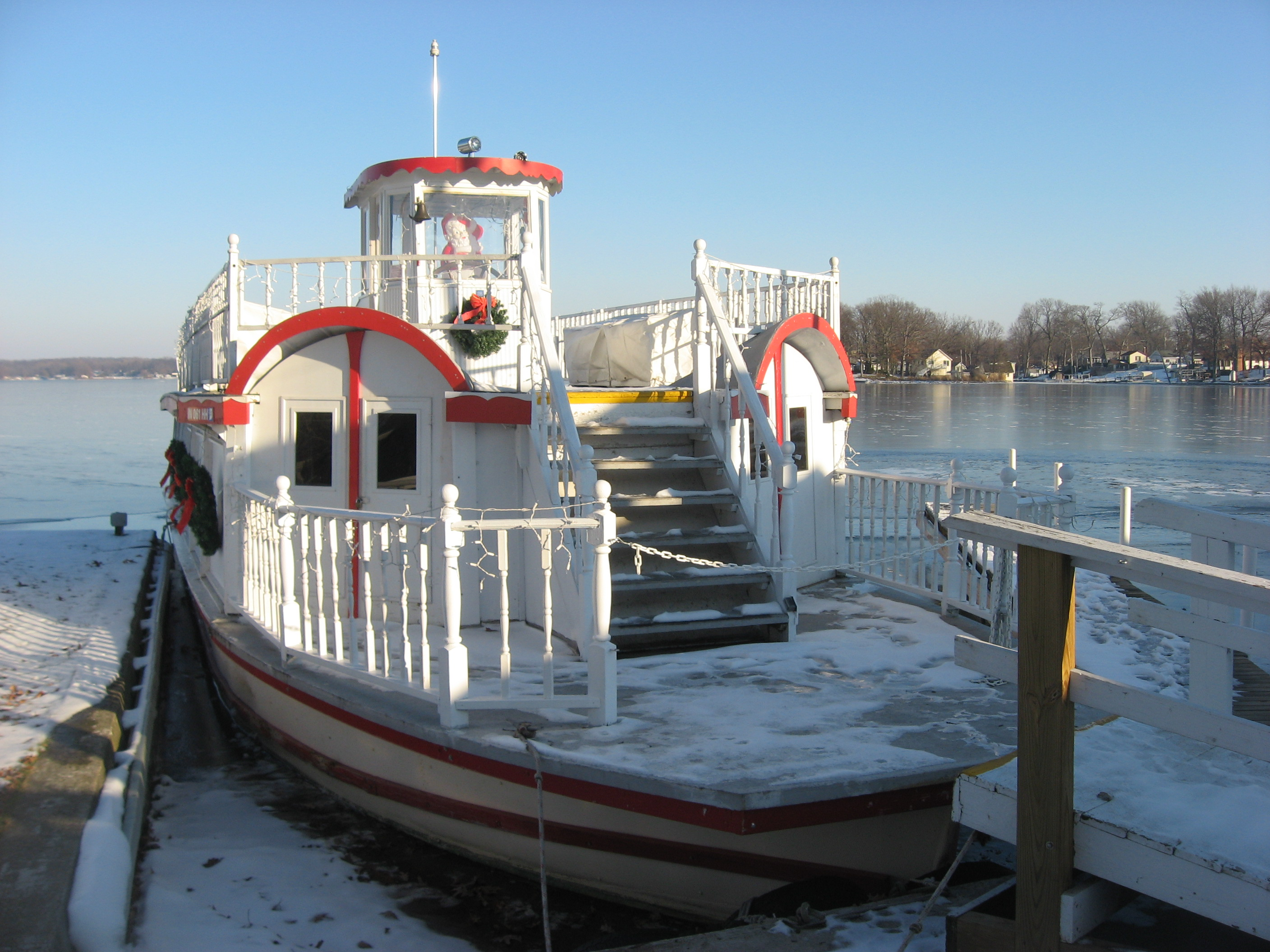
Dixie berthed for winter

North Webster is home to Dixie, Indiana's oldest sternwheel paddleboat. Dixie has cruised Webster Lake since 1929, providing tours of the lake to generations of residents and visitors. A number of private owners cared for and operated the boat from 1929 until 2007 when title was transferred to a nonprofit organization called Dixie Sternwheeler Inc., which operates the boat for regular summer cruises from Memorial Day weekend through Labor Day and to allow chartered events such as weddings, retirement home outings, and company and community gatherings. Regular cruises last about 75 minutes and are each evening Monday through Saturday and during the afternoon and evening on Sunday. Many of the regular cruises feature period music and a narration with some history of the area, the lake, and Dixie.

Dixie was added to the National Register of Historic Places in 2009.

== Historical ==
=== Boats ===
- Cuban Girl (1902–) was a small steam launch approximately 28 feet (9 m) in length.
- The City of Webster (1906–1913) was a 40 feet (12 m) sternwheel paddle boat
- Ethel H (1904–1909) was a sidewheel steamboat, approximately 45 feet (14 m) in length. The Ethel H was also known to have gone to Lake Tippecanoe and Lake James around 1909.

=== Webster Lake Dam ===
The Webster Lake dam was created at the southwestern point of the lake and a gristmill was built by an Ephriam Muirhead in 1837. This damming created one large lake from as many as seven smaller lakes. In 1842, Thomas Boydston purchased the gristmill. It is said that he is a descendant of Dr. Zabdiel Boylston. The mill served as a general store and post office in the 19th century. It burned in 1949 and replaced by the current dam.

=== Yellow Banks ===
The Yellow Banks hotel was formerly the M.J. France hotel (1902–1905). The Yellow Banks owned several yellow row boats for the use of its guests. It is said that when the boats were stored on the banks of the hotel property, the banks appeared yellow. Though unconfirmed, it has been said that Al Capone and gang stayed at the Yellow Banks hotel in October 1933 or April 1934.
