= Mud Lake (Indiana) =

There are over a dozen lakes named Mud Lake within the U.S. state of Indiana.

- Mud Lake, Fulton County, Indiana. 41°02′02″N 85°58′04″W
- Pierceton Lake, also known as Mud Lake, Kosciusko County, Indiana. 41°13′23″N 85°41′38″W
- Mud Lake, Kosciusko County, Indiana. 41°18′20″N 86°00′25″W
- Nauvoo Lake, also known as Mud Lake, LaGrange County, Indiana. 41°31′42″N 85°19′55″W
- Dollar Lake, also known as Mud Lake, LaGrange County, Indiana. 41°32′11″N 85°24′08″W
- Mud Lake, LaGrange County, Indiana. 41°41′47″N 85°37′43″W
- Mud Lake, Marshall County, Indiana. 41°11′32″N 86°20′31″W
- Mud Lake, Noble County, Indiana. 41°19′13″N 85°18′08″W
- Mud Lake, Noble County, Indiana. 41°20′04″N 85°24′12″W
- Mud Lake, Noble County, Indiana. 41°31′27″N 85°19′37″W
- Mud Lake, Porter County, Indiana. 41°31′14″N 87°02′29″W
- Mud Lake, Porter County, Indiana. 41°34′46″N 87°03′22″W
- Mud Lake, St. Joseph County, Indiana. 41°44′53″N 86°22′11″W
- Mud Lake, St. Joseph County, Indiana. 41°45′10″N 86°22′35″W
- Mud Lake, Steuben County, Indiana. 41°34′17″N 85°13′24″W
- Mud Lake, Steuben County, Indiana. 41°36′06″N 84°58′43″W
- Mud Lake, Steuben County, Indiana. 41°38′16″N 85°03′35″W
- Brown Lake, also known as Mud Lake, Steuben County, Indiana. 41°44′08″N 85°11′38″W
- Lone Hickory Lake, also known as Mud Lake, Steuben County, Indiana. 41°44′22″N 85°01′12″W
- Mud Lake, Steuben County, Indiana. 41°45′15″N 84°50′24″W
- Mud Lake, Wabash County, Indiana. 40°58′57″N 85°51′22″W
- Mud Lake, Whitley County, Indiana. 41°14′55″N 85°34′06″W
