= Schaefer Lake, Indiana =

- Census-designated place
- Location within Indiana Location within the United States
- Coordinates: 39°17′02″N 85°45′04″W
- Country: United States
- State: Indiana
- County: Bartholomew
- Township: Haw Creek

Area
  - Total: 0.35 sq mi (0.91 km^{2})
  - Land: 0.22 sq mi (0.57 km^{2})
  - Water: 0.12 sq mi (0.31 km^{2})
- Elevation: 699 ft (213 m)
- Time zone: UTC-5 (Eastern (EST))
  - Summer (DST): UTC-4 (EDT)
- ZIP code: 47246 (Hope)
- Area codes: 812 & 930
- FIPS code: 18-68202
- GNIS feature ID: 2830317

Schaefer Lake is an unincorporated community and census-designated place (CDP) in Bartholomew County, Indiana, United States. It is part of the Columbus, Indiana, metropolitan statistical area.

== Geography ==
The community is in northeastern Bartholomew County, built around a reservoir of the same name built on Duck Creek. The town of Hope is 1 mile (1.6 km) to the northwest, while Columbus, the county seat, is 13 miles (21 km) to the southwest.

According to the United States Census Bureau, the Schaefer Lake CDP has a total area of 0.35 square miles (0.91 km^{2}), of which 0.22 square miles (0.57 km^{2}) are land and 0.12 square miles (0.31 km^{2}), or 35.63%, are water. Via Duck Creek, the lake drains south to Clifty Creek, a west-flowing tributary of the East Fork of the White River.

== Demographics ==
Historical population
| Census | Pop. | Note | %± |
|---|---|---|---|
| 2023 (est.) | 245 |

The United States Census Bureau defined Schaefer Lake as a census designated place in the 2022 American Community Survey.
