= Snow Lake, Indiana =

- Census-designated place
- Location within Indiana Location within the United States
- Coordinates: 41°43′49″N 85°01′58″W
- Country: United States
- State: Indiana
- County: Steuben
- Township: Jamestown

Area
  - Total: 1.08 sq mi (2.8 km^{2})
  - Land: 0.60 sq mi (1.6 km^{2})
  - Water: 0.48 sq mi (1.2 km^{2})
- Elevation: 965 ft (294 m)
- Time zone: UTC-5 (Eastern (EST))
  - Summer (DST): UTC-4 (EDT)
- ZIP code: 46737 (Fremont)
- Area code: 260
- FIPS code: 18-70470
- GNIS feature ID: 2830548

Snow Lake is an unincorporated community and census-designated place (CDP) in Steuben County, Indiana, United States.

== Geography ==
The community is in northwestern Steuben County, consisting of development on the north, east, and west sides of Snow Lake, a natural water body. Indiana State Road 120 forms the northeastern edge of the CDP, leading east 5 miles (8 km) to Fremont and west 8 miles (13 km) to Orland. Angola, the Steuben county seat, is eight miles to the south.

According to the U.S. Census Bureau, the Snow Lake CDP has a total area of 1.08 square miles (2.80 km^{2}), of which 0.60 square miles (1.55 km^{2}) are land and 0.48 square miles (1.24 km^{2}), or 44.52%, are water. The lake's outlet is at its southern end, flowing into Lake James, part of the St. Joseph River watershed flowing west to Lake Michigan.

== Demographics ==
Historical population
Census	Pop.	Note	%±
2023 (est.)	497

The United States Census Bureau defined Snow Lake as a census designated place in the 2022 American Community Survey.
