= Oswego, Indiana =

- Unincorporated community and Census designated place
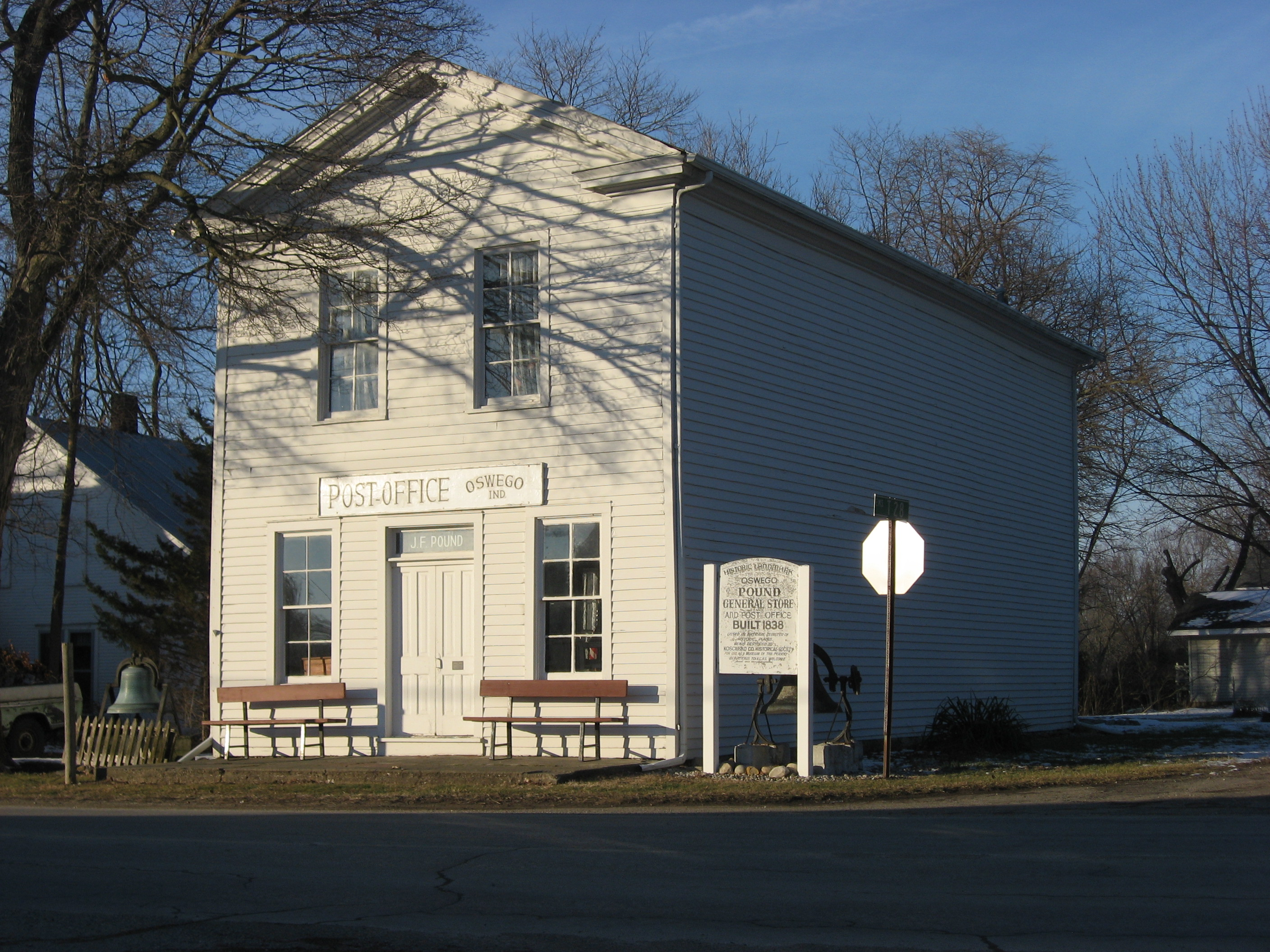
- The John Pound Store, now a museum

- Location within Indiana Location within the United States
- Coordinates: 41°19′19″N 85°47′13″W
- Country: United States
- State: Indiana
- County: Kosciusko
- Township: Plain
- Elevation: 850 ft (260 m)
- Time zone: UTC-5 (Eastern (EST))
  - Summer (DST): UTC-4 (EDT)
- ZIP code: 46538
- FIPS code: 18-57186
- GNIS feature ID: 2830432

Oswego is an unincorporated community in Plain Township, Kosciusko County, in the U.S. state of Indiana.

== History ==
Oswego was laid out in 1837. It was named after Oswego, New York. A post office was established at Oswego in 1840, and remained in operation until it was discontinued in 1935.

== Geography ==
Oswego is located near the western shore of Lake Tippecanoe.

== Demographics ==
The United States Census Bureau defined Oswego as a census designated place in the 2022 American Community Survey.
