= Chain O' Lakes State Park (Indiana) =

State park in Noble County, Indiana

- IUCN category V (protected landscape/seascape)
- Location within Indiana
- Location: Noble County, Indiana, United States
- Nearest city: Albion, Indiana
- Coordinates: 41°19′59″N 85°22′50″W
- Area: 2,718 acres (11.00 km^{2})
- Established: 1960
- Visitors: 336,392 (in 2018–2019)
- Governing body: Indiana Department of Natural Resources
- Website: www.in.gov/dnr/parklake/2987.htm

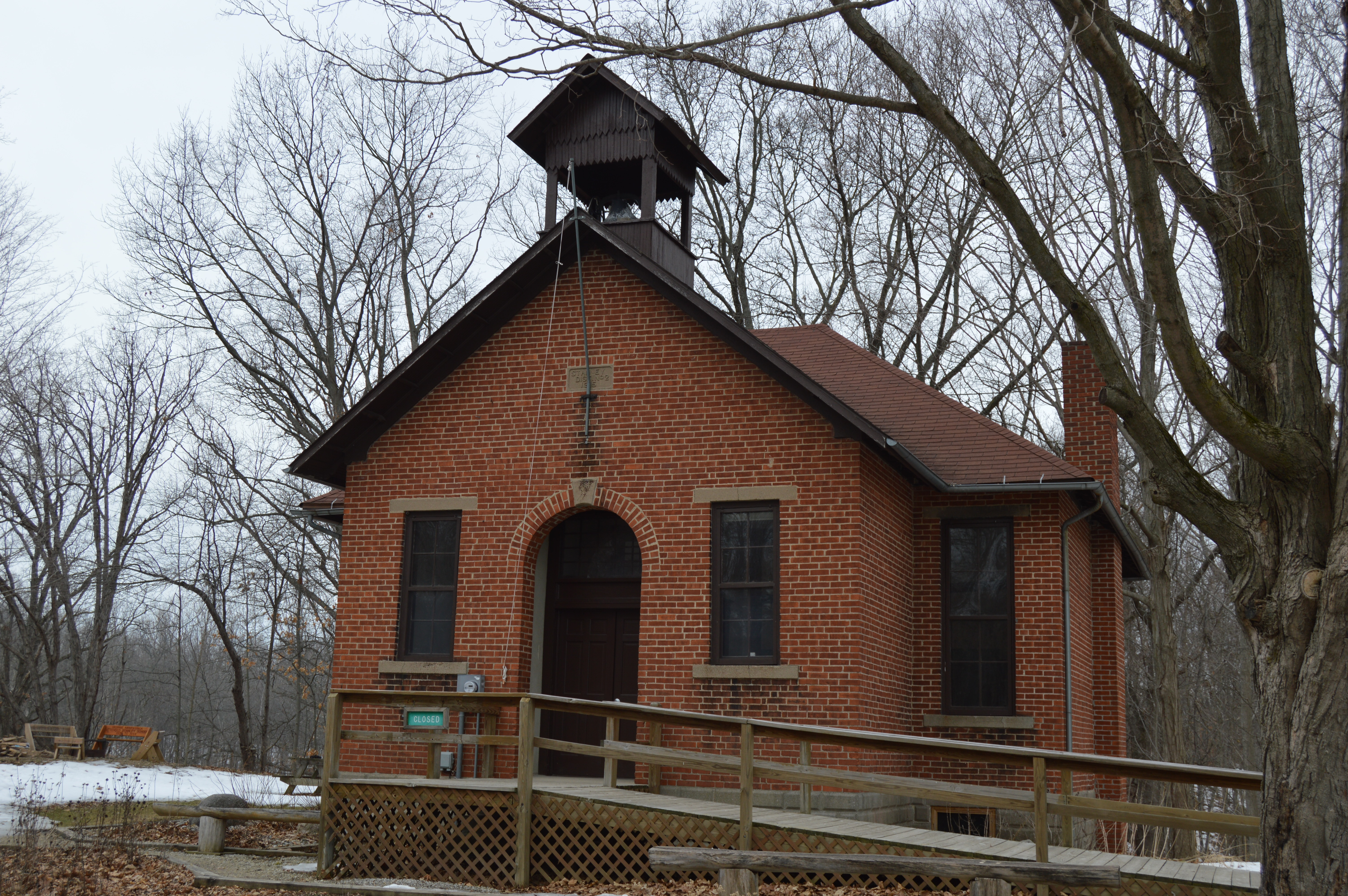
Nature center, the former Stanley School-District No. 2.

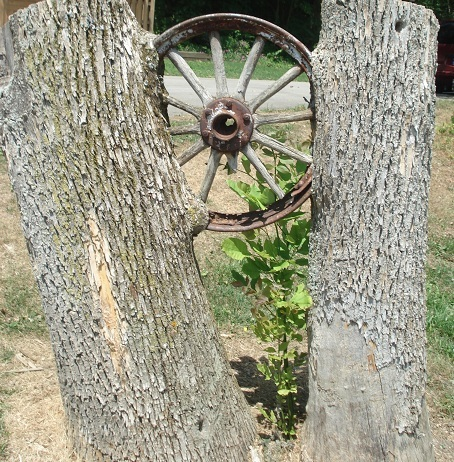
A wagon wheel grown into the V of a deceased Ash tree, near the boat launch on Long Lake (2012).

Chain O' Lakes is an Indiana state park on 2,718 acres (11.00 km^{2}) in Noble County, Indiana, in the United States. The park is located near the towns of Albion and Avilla and is 19 miles (31 km) northwest of the northeastern Indiana's major city, Fort Wayne.

== History ==
The desire by residents of Northeastern Indiana to have their own state park grew into a concerted effort to establish Chain O' Lakes State Park during the 1940s and 1950s. Various local government officials, civic organizations, chambers of commerce and newspapers from communities across Northeastern Indiana—including Albion, Columbia City, Churubusco, Kendallville, and Fort Wayne—began to promote and support the park's establishment. The Chain O' Lakes Joint Park Board began a massive fundraising effort, which collected funds to establish the park from counties across Northeastern Indiana. A significant amount of funds were collected specifically in Allen County—where Fort Wayne is located. Notable opposition to the park's establishment came from DeKalb County—a neighbor to Noble County—where officials refused to support a plan to protect the land surrounding the Chain O' Lakes because they wanted to build a state road on the land.

Eventually, enabling legislation to establish the park made its way through the Indiana General Assembly. Indiana Governor Ralph F. Gates was an outspoken supporter of the effort to establish the park, continuing to promote the cause even after leaving office. Chain O' Lakes State Park was established in 1960. Then-Indiana Governor Harold W. Handley spoke at the park's opening ceremony, as did former Governor Gates.

== Activities ==
Shoreline of a kettle lake at Chain O' Lakes State Park, Indiana, 2026

As the name suggests, it is a park for boaters, with nine connecting lakes, and eleven lakes total. The lakes are kettle lakes, formed by receding ice sheets of the Pleistocene Epoch, which also made the steeply rolling hills and bogs of the park. Bowen Lake is the deepest at 65 feet (20 m), and Dock Lake is the shallowest at 20 feet (6 m) deep. Outwash sediments, sediment from Canada, and muck/peat-filled bogs caused by the glaciers are accessible by the several miles of hiking trails. Powerboats on the lakes are restricted to electric motors only.

There are more than 10 miles (16 km) of hiking trails. Cross-country skiing is available in the winter. There is one large campground as well as a Rally campground, a Youth Tent Area, and a canoe camp. There are also 18 furnished cabins available for rental. There is one swimming area in the park.

The Chain O' Lakes Correctional Facility was established inside of the state park in 1967. Located on the northeastern edge of the park, the facility comprises six buildings and has the capacity to house 140 adult male offenders, offering inmates educational and treatment programs. The facility provides work crews that help maintain Chain O' Lakes State Park, as well as the nearby Pokagon State Park in Steuben County.

Starting in 2011, Chain O' Lakes State Park has served as the site of The HUFF 50K Trail Run and Relay, the twelfth largest ultramarathon in North America.
