= Wall Lake, Indiana =

- Census-designated place
- Location within Indiana Location within the United States
- Coordinates: 41°43′47″N 85°12′00″W
- Country: United States
- State: Indiana
- Counties: LaGrange, Steuben
- Townships: Greenfield, Millgrove

Area
  - Total: 0.75 sq mi (1.9 km^{2})
  - Land: 0.54 sq mi (1.4 km^{2})
  - Water: 0.21 sq mi (0.54 km^{2})
- Elevation: 942 ft (287 m)
- Time zone: UTC-5 (Eastern (EST))
  - Summer (DST): UTC-4 (EDT)
- ZIP code: 46776 (Orland)
- Area code: 260
- FIPS code: 18-79784
- GNIS feature ID: 2830442

Wall Lake is an unincorporated community and census-designated place (CDP) in LaGrange and Steuben counties, Indiana, United States.

== Geography ==
The community is mostly in northeastern LaGrange County, surrounding the natural water body of Wall Lake. The CDP extends east into the northwest corner of Steuben County, although the lake itself is only in LaGrange County. The community and lake are 1 mile (1.6 km) west of Orland and 16 miles (26 km) northeast of LaGrange, the LaGrange county seat. The Michigan state line is 2 miles (3 km) to the north.

According to the U.S. Census Bureau, the Wall Lake CDP has a total area of 0.75 square miles (1.94 km^{2}), of which 0.54 square miles (1.40 km^{2}) are land and 0.21 square miles (0.54 km^{2}), or 27.75%, are water.

The lake connects at its northeast end by a short outlet to Brown Lake, partially within the CDP. The lake system drains north to the Fawn River, a northwest-flowing tributary of the St. Joseph River leading to Lake Michigan.

== Demographics ==
Historical population
Census	Pop.	Note	%±
2023 (est.)	256

The United States Census Bureau defined Wall Lake as a census designated place in the 2022 American Community Survey.
