= Grandview Lake, Indiana =

- Unincorporated community
- Bartholomew County's location in Indiana

- Location in Bartholomew County
- Coordinates: 39°09′05″N 86°02′44″W
- Country: United States
- State: Indiana
- County: Bartholomew
- Township: Ohio
- Elevation: 732 ft (223 m)
- Time zone: UTC-5 (Eastern (EST))
  - Summer (DST): UTC-4 (EDT)
- ZIP code: 47201
- Area codes: 812 & 930
- GNIS feature ID: 2830311

Grandview Lake is an platted town and census-designated place in Ohio Township, Bartholomew County, in the U.S. state of Indiana. It shares its name with the lake at its center. It was largely developed in the 1960s.

== Geography ==
Grandview Lake is located about 10 miles (16 km) southwest of the county- seat, Columbus. The man-made lake is 400 acres (160 ha) in size. The dam, completed in 1965, is at the head of the East Fork White Creek.

== Demographics ==
The United States Census Bureau delineated Grandview Lake as a census designated place in the 2022 American Community Survey.

== See also ==
- List of lakes of Indiana
