= Tippecanoe Lake =

Lake Tippecanoe
- Location within Indiana Location within the United States

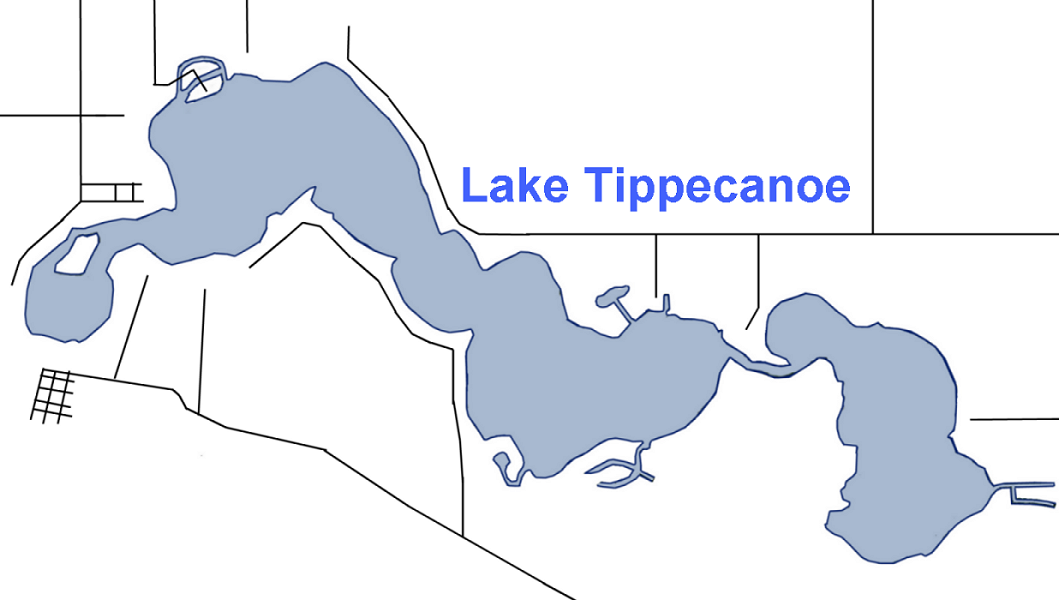
- Location: Leesburg, Kosciusko County, Indiana, US
- Coordinates: 41°19′40″N 085°45′35″W
- Type: Glacial lake
- Primary inflows: James Lake, Grassy Creek
- Primary outflows: Oswego Lake to Tippecanoe River
- Basin countries: United States
- Surface area: 880 acres (360 ha)
- Average depth: 37 ft (11 m)
- Max. depth: 123 ft (37 m)
- Residence time: 4 years
- Surface elevation: 837 ft (255 m)

Tippecanoe Lake (/ˌtɪpəkəˈnuː/ TIP-ə-kə-NOO) is a large, glacially created lake in Leesburg, Kosciusko County, Indiana and, at 123 feet (37 m) deep, is the deepest natural lake in the state.

== Location ==
Tippecanoe Lake is about two miles west of the town of North Webster, Indiana, and Webster Lake with the small unincorporated area of Oswego (now located in Leesburg, Indiana) located near its west-northwestern shore.

== Recreation ==
Tippecanoe Lake is used mostly for recreational purposes such as fishing, boating and skiing, and is surrounded mostly by residential housing. A prominent historical location is on the southwest shore of the lake: Tippy Dance Hall. Built in the late 1950s, the unique building (covered and open air) hosted many musical artists such as Duke Ellington, Louis Armstrong and the 1960s act The Byrds. From the mid-1980s through 2016, Tippy Dance Hall was a teen dance club with Saturday night dances from Memorial Day until just after Labor day.

== Geographic place names ==
- Bell Rohr Park is on Patona Bay on Tippecanoe's extreme northwest shore. Patona Bay Resort and Patona Bay Marina are found there.
- Black's Landing is on Tippecanoe's northern shore across from Government Point.
- Forest Glen is on Tippecanoe's central western shore and east of Stanton Lake.
- Government Point is located on Tippecanoe's southern shore, just north of Pie-Eyed Petey's Marina and just east of Indian Hills Golf Course.
- Kalorama Park is opposite Forest Glen on Tippecanoe's northern shore. This is also the home of Tippecanoe Lake Country Club.
- Mineral Springs is on Tippecanoe's southeastern shore.
- Stony Ridge is on Tippecanoe's northwestern shore and across Patona Bay from Bel Rohr Park.
- Walker's Landing is on Tippecanoe's northern shore west of Black's Landing.

== Establishments ==
=== Tippecanoe Lake Country Club ===
Tippecanoe Lake Country Club is a private club and one of the lake's largest attractions. It is north of Kalorama Park at 7245 N Kalorama Road and accessed from Indiana State Road 13 via Kosciusko County Roads E650N and E800N. TLCC, a private club, was opened on April 15, 1926, with the clubhouse opening on June 11 of that year. The club joined the Chicago District Golf Association in the 1950s. From 1959 through the early 1960s, the club also hosted LPGA tournaments. Professionals such as Kathy Cornelius of Phoenix, Arizona, and Mickey Wright of Port St. Lucie, Florida, played Tippecanoe. Aside from golf, T.L.C.C. also provides tennis, swimming and boating, and is an excellent location to watch the fireworks display for the 4 July.

=== Marinas ===
Patona Bay Marina and Resort

Patona Bay Marina is located on the west shore of Lake Tippecanoe. The marina is a dealership complemented by a full-service parts and service department. The marina also offers boat and kayak rentals, daily or weekly. The marina offers boat storage for a fee, and installation and removal of both boats and boat lifts at the beginning and end of the boating season.

Patona Bay Resort has existed since the 1920s. It has grown into several-hundred unit seasonal resort, which allows patrons to pay seasonal rent to reside at the Resort during the summer months (late April to early October). The park also offers limited weekend/weekly lot rentals for those that have mobile campers or RVs. There is also a small tent camping section available. Seasonal park residents own their homes but must rent the lots on a yearly basis. The resort also includes a snack bar with a small arcade, a free library and reading area for children, and features a nostalgic lake theme. It is generally open from mid-May to just after Labor Day. Patona Bay also provides a private swimming beach with several areas for children to play, and other amenities such as a pet walk for dogs, as well as family events during the summer holiday weekends.

== Public access ==
Public access to Tippecanoe Lake is available via:

- Grassy Creek. A tributary that connects, by way of a manually operated lock, the east shore of Tippecanoe Lake to Sawmill, Sechrist, Banning, Irish, Little Barbee, Big Barbee and Kuhn lakes upstream. The ramp is on the east shore of the creek along Armstrong Road, just north of the lock. Large boats such as large ski/wake surf boats will NOT be able to navigate to Lake Tippecanoe due to a viaduct that has a maximum height of around 5-6 feet, depending on the water height. Smaller fishing boats and personal watercraft can pass under this section, however.
- Patona Bay Resort on the northwest shore. $10 per day or you may purchase a season pass. Free to resort residents and their guests, and resort rental residents.
- Tippy Dance Hall on the southwest shore, $10 per day. Seasonal passes available at Patona Bay Resort, as they own the property where this ramp is located.
- Tippecanoe Boat Company on the northeast shore
- NOTE: As of June, 2026 the ramp at the former Pie Eyed Petey's restaurant will be removed to make way for a new restaurant and condominium complex

== Drainage ==
Tippecanoe is drained by the Tippecanoe River which flows generally south to the Wabash River. The river ends near Battle Ground, Indiana, in Tippecanoe county.

Two reservoirs, Lake Shafer and Lake Freeman, are fed by the Tippecanoe River. The reservoirs both have dams controlling inflow from the Tippecanoe River.

== Notable residents ==
A notable resident was Chris Schenkel. Schenkel announced the Triple Crown horse races and the Masters Tournament on CBS. With ABC Sports he was Olympic anchorman, college football, NBA, and PBA bowling announcer.
