= Leesburg Historic District (Leesburg, Indiana) =

Historic district in Indiana, United States

- U.S. National Register of Historic Places
- U.S. Historic district
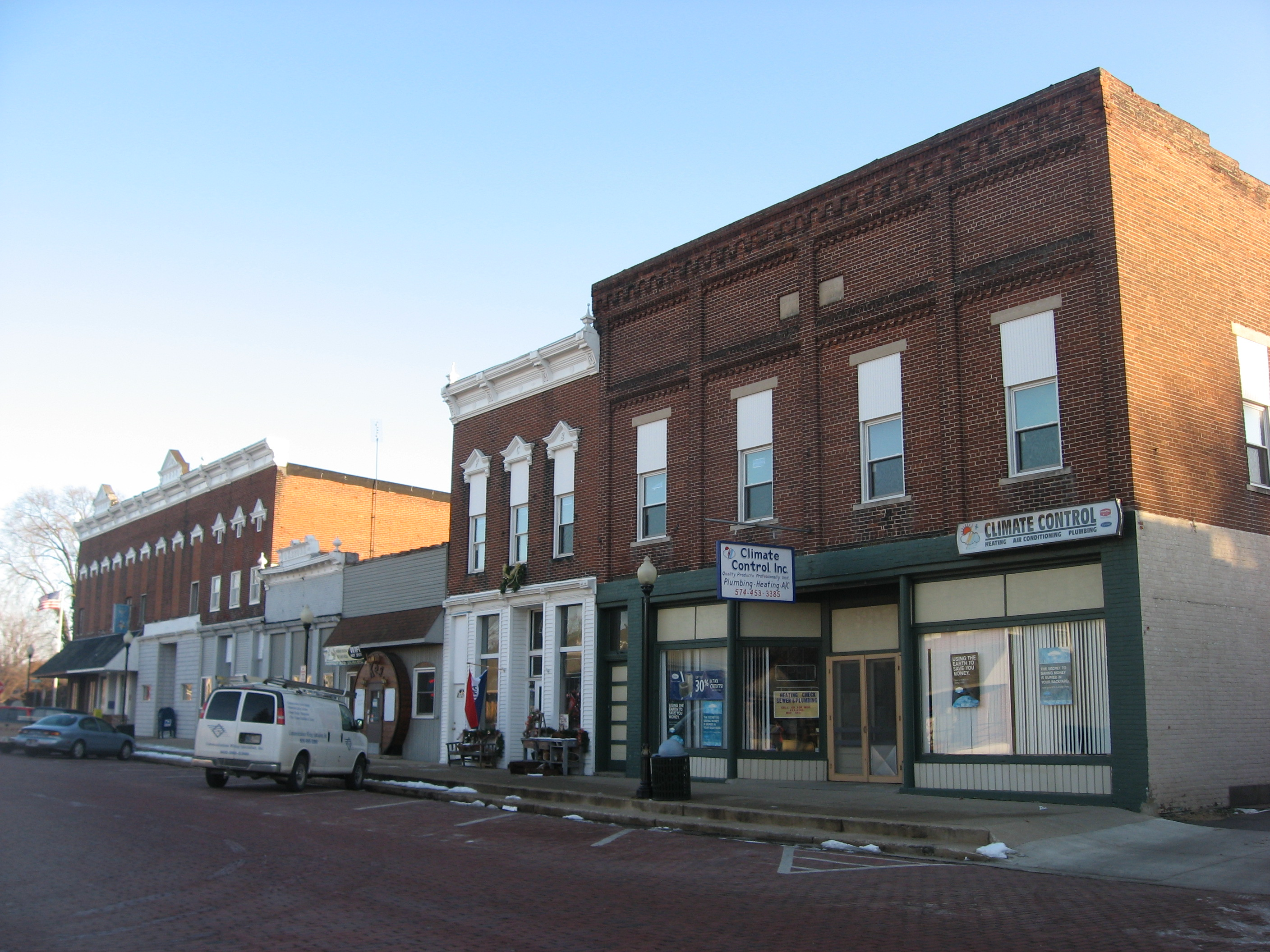
- West Van Buren Street, January 2013

- Location within Indiana Location within the United States
- Location: 100 block of E. and W. Van Buren St., Leesburg, Indiana
- Coordinates: 41°19′54″N 85°51′00″W
- Area: 6.5 acres (2.6 ha)
- Architect: Powell, Cecil; Public Works Administration
- Architectural style: Early Commercial, Late Victorian, Italianate
- NRHP reference No.: 93000465
- Added to NRHP: May 27, 1993

Leesburg Historic District is a national historic district located at Leesburg, Indiana. The district encompasses 21 contributing buildings, and one contributing structure in the central business district and surrounding residential section of Leesburg. It developed between about 1865 and 1936, and includes notable examples of Italianate, Late Victorian, and Early Commercial style architecture. Notable buildings include the Public Works Administration funded Town Hall (1936), Masonic / IOOF Building (1890), D.K. Brown Building (1890), Wallace House (c. 1890), and Hart Brown House (1900).

It was listed on the National Register of Historic Places in 1993.
