= Dewart Lake =

- Location within Indiana Location within the United States
- Location: Kosciusko County, Indiana
- Coordinates: 41°22′03.31″N 85°46′18.2″W
- Type: lake
- Surface area: 551 acres (223 ha)
- Surface elevation: 866 ft (264 m)

Dewart Lake, (formerly Lake Wawasee before Turkey Lake became Lake Wawasee), is a natural lake southwest of Syracuse in Kosciusko County, Indiana, United States. It was formed during the most recent glacial retreat of the Pleistocene era.

Dewart Lake is a 551 acres (223 ha) natural lake, located three miles (4.8 km) south of Syracuse and three miles (4.8 km) east of Indiana State Road 15. 41 degrees 22' 03.31" North Latitude x 85 degrees 46' 18.22" West Longitude, 867.70 feet (264.47 m) above Sea Level. 82 feet (25 m) is the maximum depth with an average depth of 16.3 feet (5.0 m). It lies within the Elkhart River watershed and drains 5,152 acres (2,085 ha). Two small inlets enter on the east side and the outlet, Hammond Ditch, leaves the west side and flows to Waubee Lake. Large areas on the north and south sides of the lake are less than 5 feet (1.5 m) deep. Hydraulic retention time is 601 days. Farming is the main watershed use, although woodlots and wetlands are present. Nearly all of the shoreline is residentially developed. Areas of natural shoreline and wetlands are present along the south shore and in the northeast corner adjacent to a private camp. A state-owned boat ramp is available in the northwest corner on CR 300E.

Dewart Lake is moderately fertile. Its trophic index is 36. Enough oxygen is present for fish 20 deep but levels drop too low below 20 feet (less than 4 ppm.). Water clarity varies from 6 through 13 1/2 feet. The bottom is mostly sand and muck, but boulders and gravel are also present. Eurasian Water Millfol is the dominant submerged aquatic plant. (The lake was treated for this non-indigenous plant in 2006.) Cattails, spatterdock and water lilies are the major emergent plants. In recent years, an extensive cattail stand along the south shore has been replaced with lilies. Some past management at Dewart Lake has been directed at maintaining the native fishery and creating walleye fishing opportunities.

== Naming history ==
Surveyor's field notes dated February 21, 1835, describe the lake as "two square miles located in the southeast corner of Van Buren township known by the Indian name of Wa-we-as-see (pronounced Wawasee)".

The land in northern Indiana was opened for settlement on March 20, 1837. Shortly thereafter, President Martin Van Buren granted a land patent of 77.53 acres that contained the lake to Thomas and Matelene Lingle. Soon after this, the lake was renamed Lingle Lake.

The property changed hands several times. The Dewarts purchased the land for $1200 on May 8, 1844. The name Lingle Lake continued on some legal documents well into the early 1900s. Finally the Dewart name won out and the lake became officially known as Dewart Lake.
