= Shoe Lake (Indiana) =

Lake in Kosciusko County, Indiana, United States

- Location within Indiana Location within the United States

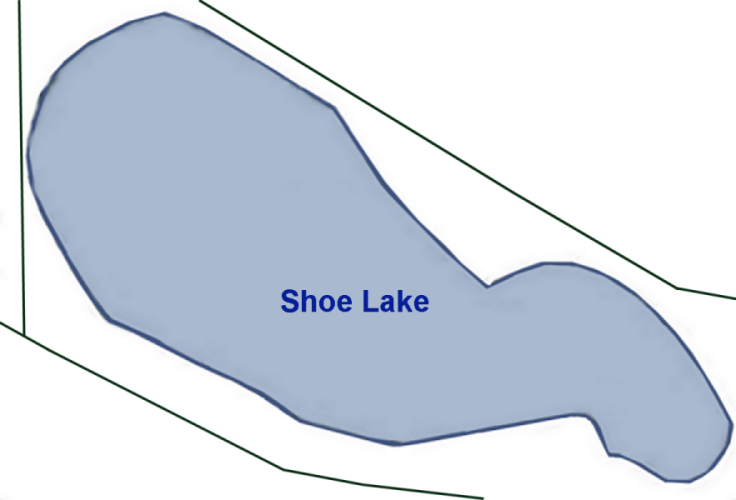
- outline map
- Location: Kosciusko County, North Central Indiana, United States
- Group: Barbee lakes chain
- Coordinates: 41°18′27″N 85°44′59″W
- Primary inflows: Spring
- Primary outflows: into Banning Lake
- Basin countries: United States
- Max. length: 3,000 ft (910 m)
- Max. width: 700 ft (210 m)
- Water volume: 4,749 acre⋅ft (5,858,000 m^{3})
- Surface elevation: 842 ft (257 m)
- Islands: 0
- Settlements: 0

Shoe Lake is a fresh water lake located in Kosciusko County, Indiana, United States. It is the inflow point for water entering Banning Lake (Barbee chain of lakes).
