= Leesburg, Indiana =

- Town
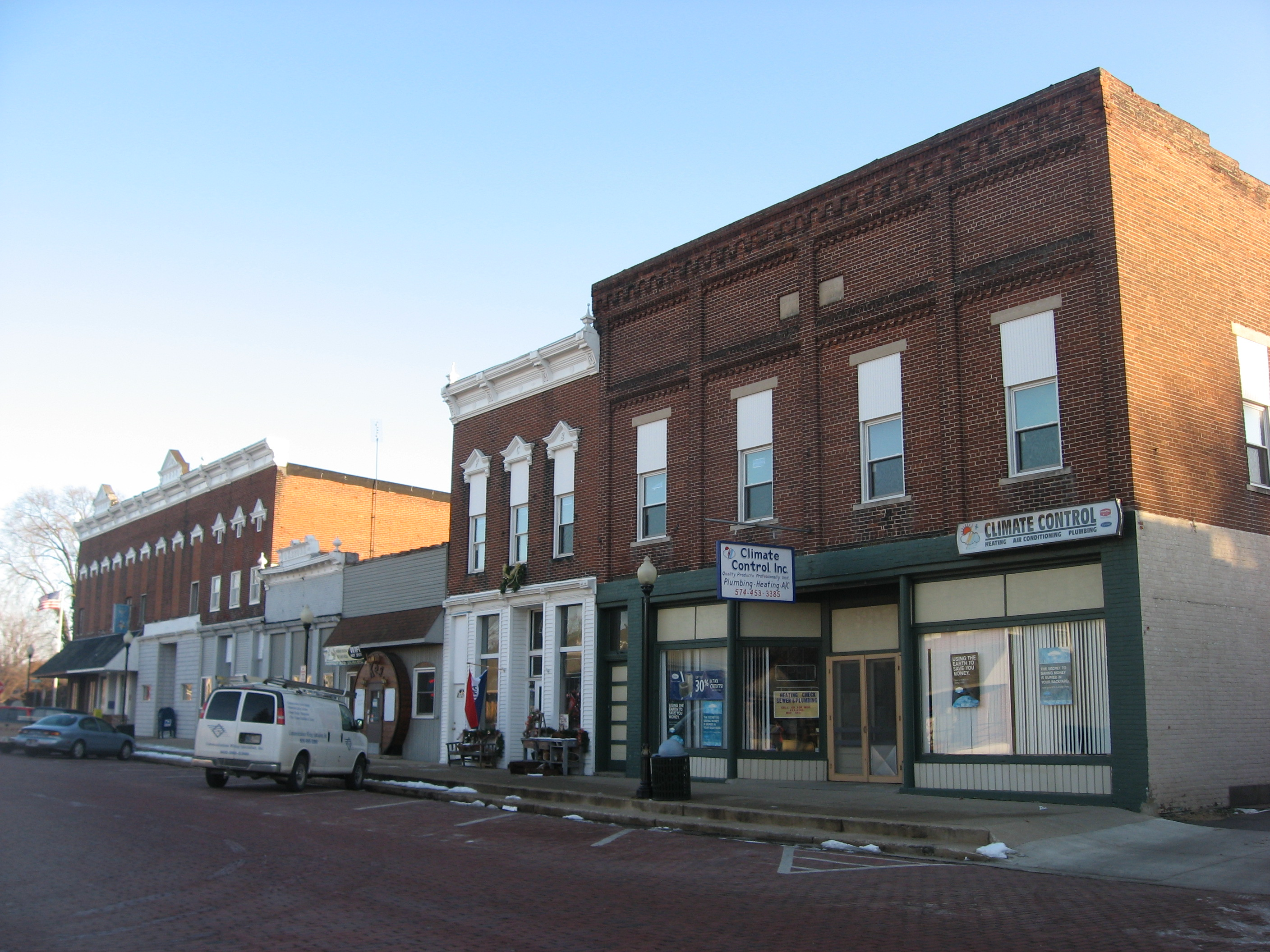
- Van Buren Street downtown
- Motto: "Gateway To the Lakes Region"
- Location of Leesburg in Kosciusko County, Indiana.
- Coordinates: 41°19′50″N 85°50′56″W
- Country: United States
- State: Indiana
- County: Kosciusko
- Township: Plain
- Established: 1833

Area
  - Total: 0.25 sq mi (0.66 km^{2})
  - Land: 0.25 sq mi (0.66 km^{2})
  - Water: 0 sq mi (0.00 km^{2})
- Elevation: 856 ft (261 m)

Population (2020)
  - Total: 555
  - Density: 2,167.8/sq mi (837.01/km^{2})
- Time zone: UTC-5 (Eastern (EST))
  - Summer (DST): UTC-4 (EDT)
- ZIP code: 46538
- Area code: 574
- FIPS code: 18-42678
- GNIS feature ID: 2396712
- Website: www.leesburgindiana.com

Leesburg is a town in Plain Township, Kosciusko County, in the U.S. state of Indiana. The population was 555 at the 2020 Census. The town of Leesburg was laid out in 1833 by Levi Lee. It includes the Leesburg Historic District.

== Etymology ==
Leesburg, named for Levi Lee, was established in August 1833. The post office at Leesburg has been in operation since 1839.

The Leesburg Historic District was listed on the National Register of Historic Places in 1993.

== History ==
Leesburg is the oldest town in Kosciusko County. It was the county seat until November 1854, when the Pennsylvania Railroad reached Warsaw. It was home to the first judicial courthouse in the county.

== Geography ==
According to the 2010 census, Leesburg has a total area of 0.26 square miles (0.67 km^{2}), all land.

== Demographics ==
Historical population
Census	Pop.	Note	%±
1850	217		—
1860	289		33.2%
1870	326		12.8%
1880	354		8.6%
1890	345		−2.5%
1900	390		13.0%
1910	401		2.8%
1920	369		−8.0%
1930	371		0.5%
1940	389		4.9%
1950	428		10.0%
1960	427		−0.2%
1970	561		31.4%
1980	629		12.1%
1990	584		−7.2%
2000	625		7.0%
2010	555		−11.2%
2020	555		0.0%
U.S. Decennial Census

=== 2010 census ===
As of the census of 2010, there were 555 people, 214 households, and 152 families living in the town. The population density was 2,134.6 inhabitants per square mile (824.2/km^{2}). There were 239 housing units at an average density of 919.2 per square mile (354.9/km^{2}). The racial makeup of the town was 91.7% White, 0.2% African American, 0.2% Native American, 2.3% Asian, 4.3% from other races, and 1.3% from two or more races. Hispanic or Latino of any race were 7.7% of the population.

There were 214 households, of which 37.4% had children under the age of 18 living with them, 57.5% were married couples living together, 6.5% had a female householder with no husband present, 7.0% had a male householder with no wife present, and 29.0% were non-families. 24.8% of all households were made up of individuals, and 8.4% had someone living alone who was 65 years of age or older. The average household size was 2.59 and the average family size was 3.04.

The median age in the town was 38.3 years. 26.7% of residents were under the age of 18; 5.6% were between the ages of 18 and 24; 27.9% were from 25 to 44; 24.6% were from 45 to 64; and 15% were 65 years of age or older. The gender makeup of the town was 49.2% male and 50.8% female.

=== 2000 census ===
As of the census of 2000, there were 625 people, 232 households, and 176 families living in the town. The population density was 2,689.8 inhabitants per square mile (1,038.5/km^{2}). There were 240 housing units at an average density of 1,032.9 per square mile (398.8/km^{2}). The racial makeup of the town was 90.40% White, 0.32% African American, 0.48% Native American, 3.04% Asian, 4.16% from other races, and 1.60% from two or more races. Hispanic or Latino of any race were 7.52% of the population.

There were 232 households, out of which 37.1% had children under the age of 18 living with them, 67.2% were married couples living together, 4.7% had a female householder with no husband present, and 24.1% were non-families. 20.7% of all households were made up of individuals, and 7.8% had someone living alone who was 65 years of age or older. The average household size was 2.69 and the average family size was 3.10.

In the town, the population was spread out, with 26.4% under the age of 18, 6.7% from 18 to 24, 33.1% from 25 to 44, 23.8% from 45 to 64, and 9.9% who were 65 years of age or older. The median age was 35 years. For every 100 females, there were 101.0 males. For every 100 females age 18 and over, there were 103.5 males.

The median income for a household in the town was $46,750, and the median income for a family was $49,091. Males had a median income of $32,656 versus $23,438 for females. The per capita income for the town was $20,031. About 2.3% of families and 5.2% of the population were below the poverty line, including 2.6% of those under age 18 and 6.3% of those age 65 or over.
