= History of Lake Wawasee =

Freshwater lake in Indiana, United States

Coordinates: 41°24′02″N 85°42′08″W

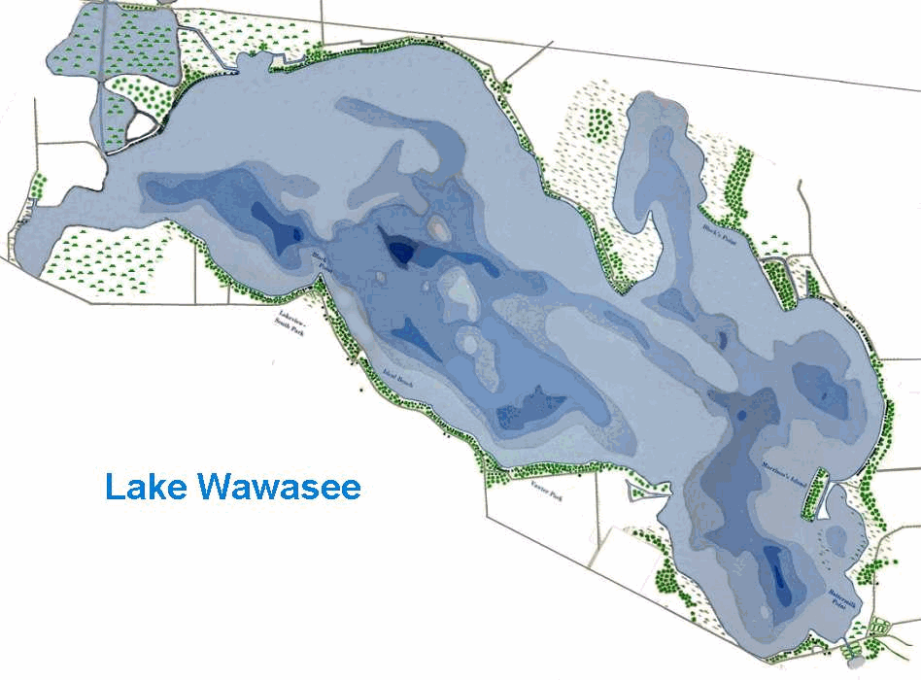
Lake Wawasee 1910

Lake Wawasee is a large, natural, freshwater lake southeast of Syracuse in Kosciusko County, Indiana. It is the largest natural lake within Indiana's borders.

== Prehistoric ==
=== Pre-glacial ===
Around 1 million years ago just prior to the Pleistocene epoch, northern Indiana was covered by the Teays River system which flowed northwest out of Virginia, West Virginia, and Ohio entering Indiana at Adams County and flowed about 45 miles (72 km) south of what is now Lake Wawassee.

=== Post-glacial ===
After the last glaciation period, the land was left with kettle holes and hilly moraines. The land supported large vast Picea evergreen forests, and balsam poplar, which gave way to hardwoods of oak, poplar and hickory. Animal life consisted of saber-toothed cat, American mastodon, short-faced bear, dire wolf, ground sloth, giant beaver, peccary, stag-moose and ancient bison. Lakes would have sturgeon, whitefish, pike, pickerel, muskellunge as well as smaller fish such as bluegill, redear sunfish, black bass, yellow perch, and catfish.

Beach formations and peat beds indicate Wawasee was 7 to 8 feet (2.1 - 2.4 m) deeper than present. Continuing running water through the outlet to the north lowered the lake level 6 to 7 feet (2 m). A dam built in 1834 consequently raised the level back to where it is today.

== Recent history ==
=== 19th century ===
Prior to Europeans coming to Turkey Lake, it was the tribal lands of Miami Indian chiefs Wawasee and Papakeecha. Wawasee was a signatory to the Treaty of Mississinewas and in 1828 was allotted a small village approximately two and one-half miles southeast of Milford and northeast of Waubee Lake where the town of Syracuse is located. It also included the eastern shores of Turkey Lake (Lake Wawasee) effectively bisecting the lake in half with the southern half going to his brother.

Early settlers were homesteaders who earned their livelihoods by hunting, fishing, and trapping; with a little farming. White men began coming into the area in the early 1830s and called the lake "Turkey Lake". In 1834 the U.S. government deeded the land to the Wabash and Erie Canal; who, in 1875, sold it to Charles R. Ogden. Ownership was passed on to "Uncle" Billy Moore in 1877.

== Wawasee geographical places ==
=== Cedar Point ===
Cedar Point is on Wawasee's eastern shore and is a glacial kame formed by a subglacial stream. This ground was inhabited by the Glacial Kame Culture that resided here from 8000 BC to 1000 BC. Indications of trade with tribes in the southern United States is evidenced by shells found from the Gulf of Mexico cut and sized to look like the sole of a shoe and circular disks 3 inches (7.6 cm) to 5 inches (12 cm) worn around the neck. Human bones were found protruding from holes in the rock face in the 1880s and often later development unearthed artifacts and skeltel material. In the 1870s or 1880s Cedar Point was inhabited by a single recluse. From the 1940s through 1950s ancient fireplaces made of groupings of burned and cracked stones were found on the top of Cedar Point.

Cedar Point was the best authenticated site of Paleoindians' existence along Wawasee's shore. During the early 20th century the ground was leveled off to use for fill disturbing the natural look of Cedar Point. Today it is home to many summer homes and year-round residents.

=== Conkling Hill ===
Conkling Hill was named after a William Conking, a settler and possible sailor during the War of 1812 who came to the area in the 1830s with his wife. In 1844 a visitor by the name of P.M. Henkle visited for a day or two of fishing recounted a small cabin with one bed. Conkling Hill was acquired by a church group in 1894 and became Oakwood Park. Today it is a 42-acre (170,000 m^{2}) religious retreat called Oakwood Foundation.(Lilly, Eli)

=== Morrison's Island ===
Morrison's Island was originally Eagle Island when the first white settlers arrived because of the bald eagles nesting there. Eagle Island was also heavily forested with a variety of trees. Morrison's Island is located on Wawasee's south-southeast end overlooking Buttermilk Bay to the south and Johnson's Bay to the north. It was named after William T. Morrison, a Civil War soldier who served with an Ohio regiment of the Union army. Morrison moved to the area and applied for a position at the old frame schoolhouse once located at Washington Street and Harrison Street.

Morrison built a cabin on Eagle Island where he and his family lived until the 1890s. The house was eventually destroyed by fire. An unsubstantiated story says he took the insurance money and purchased a new shotgun and melodeon and moved into their barn. In the 20th century Morrison sold his island property for a good sum and moved to Oregon and in a short time was back in Indiana living very well in Ligonier on his increasing pension and proceeds from his sale. Elwood George would successfully develop the island.

=== Kale Island ===
In 1862 or 1863 Kale Island was settled by two brothers by the name of Thomas and Kale Oram. They made their livelihoods catching fish by net for sale in Goshen and cleared some 20 acres (81,000 m^{2}) of land. Trees were floated through the main channel to a saw mill on Turkey Creek or one just south of Vawter Park. The poplar trees going to homes in Syracuse and oak made into barrel staves and firewood. The Oram brothers planted the area with Concord and Delaware grapes. During the Civil War, Thomas Oram joined the Union army and later moved to Kansas. Kale later married a woman named "Mam" who lived with her son Bill in a lowly cabin on Syracuse Lake. They lived on Kale Island until 1874 when the land was purchased by Mart Hillabold during the building of the B&O Railroad. Kale, Mam and her son moved to her cabin on Syracuse Lake.

In 1873 or 1874, John Wysong and March McCory built Island House on Kale Island, Lake Wawasee's first summer hotel. Badly built, it declined in popularity becoming a poker and boozing hang-out and eventually burned down. Kale Island was finally acquired by George W. Miles who had it developed into an upscale area for homes.

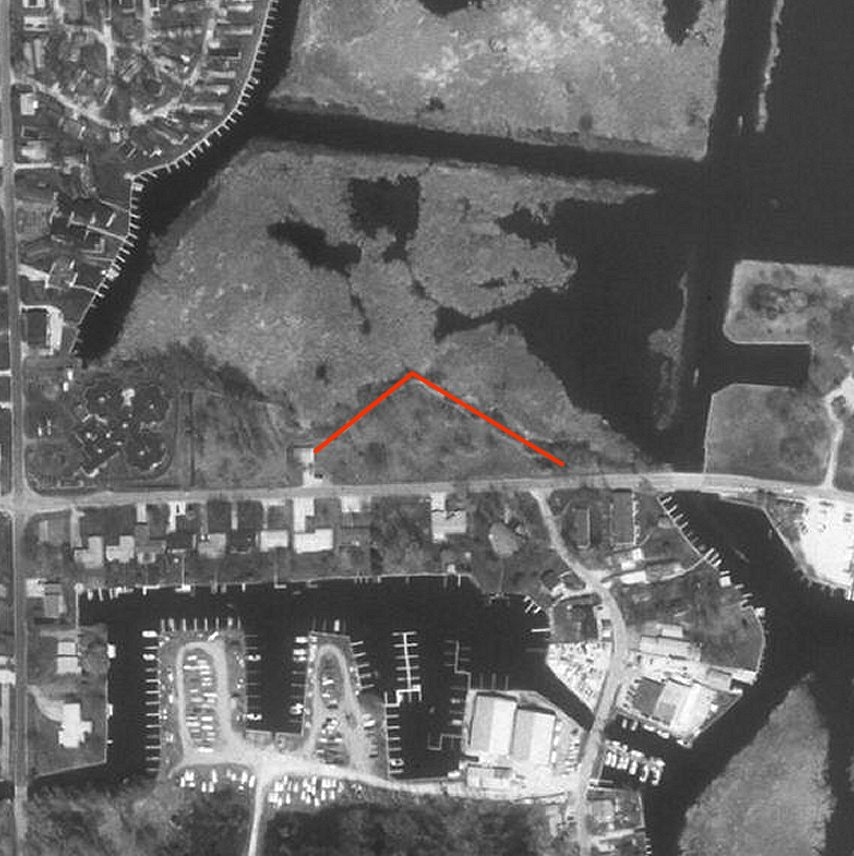
Remnants of Dog Creek Dam show as a "V" pointing north at bottom of photo.

=== Dog Creek Dam ===
Dog Creek Dam and the "fish trap" were located just off the north side of E. Pickwick Drive on Kale Island. A continuation of this dam extended south toward the higher ground of Oakwood Park. The north and west sides of this dam formed the "fish trap" which flooded in the springtime. As waters receded, local settlers would then be able to net and pitchfork fish.

The outlet between Lake Wawasee and Syracuse Lake, which flowed westward between the south and north embankments of Dog Creek Dam. It was an ideal site for a grist mill and was made by creating a millrace at that point. The first mill was built in 1834 by Sam Crosson and Henry Ward. It was destroyed somewhat quickly by either being washed away in spring flooding or by sinking into a soft bog which were numerous in Kosciusko County. The two mill stones can be seen on the north side of Kale Island and to the east of the main channel through one of the many minor channels.

== Wawasee establishments ==
=== Cedar Beach Club ===
The Cedar Beach Club was established in 1880 and was the first hotel on this site. The property was purchased by the North Lake and River Association. Judge John V. Pettit of Wabash, Indiana became president of the association with individuals from northern Indiana towns of Alexandria, Goshen, Peru, Wabash, and Huntington joining and all of which were followers of Izaac Walton which would later produce the Izaak Walton League an early environmental group. A simple oblong, two-story, gabled roof club house was constructed with 50 bedrooms and a 125-seat dining room. The North Lake and River Association financially collapsed in 1882 with the property being sold by the sheriff to the Cedar Beach Association. In 1887 the property was transferred to the Cedar Beach Club for $7000. James B. Suitt of Indianapolis was the president of the club which included James T. Layman, an Indianapolis wholesaler who had served on the Indianapolis City Common Council and Board of Aldermen 1877–1884. Addison H. Nordyke, flour mill manufacturer. William H. Holliday, F.T. Holliday, J.A. Lemcke, Robert W. Cathcart, John H. Spann, Thomas H. Spann. In 1891 the club burned. It had the first seawall on Wawasee made of logs.

=== The Jones Hotel ===
The Jones Hotel, established in September 1881 on the north shore of the lake just east of Willow Grove, was the first major establishment for entertainment on Turkey Lake. It was built by Abram M. Jones, a native of Mansfield, Ohio, who served with the 2nd Ohio Cavalry during the Civil War. In 1875 Jones, his wife Mary Duff Jones, and 2 sons moved to Syracuse. Jones was a mechanical engineer for the B&O Railroad while in Mansfield and continued working for the railroad in Syracuse as operator of the pumping station. Jones also operated the Syracuse grain elevator.

The Jones Hotel was a successful endeavor from its inception serving great meals to its patrons and visitors. The rooms were said to be comfortable. The hotel had a barn behind it where many of Wawasee's early boats and yachts were built. The Jones Hotel was sold in 1920 to Mr. M. E. Crow of Elkart.

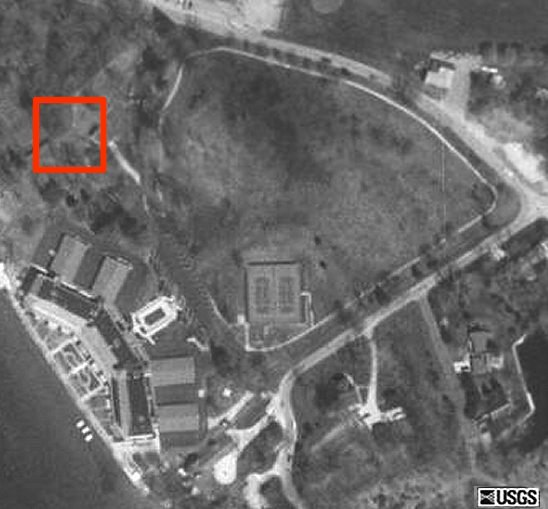
Location of Sargent's Hotel

=== Sargent's Hotel ===
The Sargent's Hotel was built in the early 20th century and owned by Mr. J. (Jess) M. Sargent. It was located on the northeast shore of the lake, bordering the north side of Spink's Wawasee Hotel and south of the Lilly homes in a grove of trees.

J. M. Sargent came to Wawasee in 1899 and assisted on refurbishing the sailboat, Mary Louise, for Bob Fishback. Eventually Sargent opened a boat repair and rental which expanded with success. Sargent married a Laura Ballard from Terre Haute and soon the Sargents were renting rooms to visitors at the lake. The Sargents then began purchasing land extending to the B&O station nearby. The hotel, built soon after, hosted dinner parties for large groups. Sargent's Hotel was razed to the ground in 1957.

=== Buttermilk Point ===
Buttermilk Point was a resort hotel located at the extreme south end of the lake and south shore of Buttermilk Bay. It was owned by Lewis Jarrett, a Civil War veteran and member of an early Wawasee family. In 1893 Lewis died and his wife, Elizabeth, became the owner. At the source of a spring, a log milkhouse was built early on which serviced the passengers in passing steamboats with buttermilk, sweet cream, and butter. Later this site would be home to the Johnson Hotel operated by the Johnson family and later sold to the Hilburt family. The Johnson Hotel, the last of the great old hotels was sold at auction in 1971.

=== The Crow's Nest ===
The Crows's Nest is on Wawasee's east-southeast shore and was built by Nathaniel N. Crow who was a pioneer farmer. Born October 13, 1823, in Champaign County, Ohio, United States, Crow left home around 1839 and traveled to Madison County, Ohio and worked as a farm hand until 1845 when he came to Kosciusko County. To purchase some land in Kosciusko County Nathaniel gave $20 and sold his horse for the 80 acres (320,000 m^{2}) he wanted. This property sat unused for years and was sold by Crow for a profit which he used to purchase a farm in Section 24 of Turkey Creek Township. The first home was built further south near what became known as Natti Crow Beach in later years.

Crow married Eliza Airgood on October 14, 1852. Eliza was born in Germany on September 13, 1832. Her parents were Frederick and Maria Airgood. Nathaniel and Eliza started their married life on the farm. Through careful farming practices, the farm swelled to 550 acres (2.2 km^{2}) of tillable land. The Crow's Nest had a blacksmith's shop operated by a spring running a hydraulic ram. The ruins of the spring and ram were remaining through until the 1960s.

In the 1950s the farm became the Crow's Nest and is located at E1100N (NE Wawasee Drive) and N. Lung Drive. The Crow house and huge barn became the Crow's Nest Yacht Club in 1959. The barn was made into a boat storage structure and is capable of housing several boats on 2-3 levels. Natti Crow Beach is one of Wawasee's true sand beaches extending as much as 20 feet (6 m) from homes to water's edge and running approximately 1,200 feet (370 m) north to south. The homes in the vicinity are included in the Natti Crow Beach Association, one of the 32 neighborhood associations which comprises Wawasee Property Owners Association. The wetlands near the Crow's Nest property are known as the WACF Nathanial Crow Wetlands according to the Wawasee Area Conservation Foundation.

=== Vawter Park ===
Vawter Park Village was plotted in 1887 and the Vawter Park Hotel was built around 1888 followed by a row of cottages extending to the southeast of the hotel. The hotel is said to have been built and furnished with Victorian era gentility. Those settling in this area were Ovid Butler of Indianapolis and others. In 1918 or 1919 Vawter Park Hotel burned to the ground. Around 1920 a new hotel was built on the site only to burn down between 1920 and 1925. The South Shore Inn would take its place in subsequent years. Indiana University operated a laboratory here for some time.

=== South Shore Inn ===
The South Shore Inn was a hotel built on the site of the old Vawter Park Hotel. During the 1950s and early 1960s, the hotel attracted visitors and patrons with a water ski jumping show. The South Shore Inn caught fire in the early morning hours of October 29, 1964. The location was just north of N. Southshore Drive and E. Vawter Park Road.

=== Wawasee Inn ===
The Wawasee Inn was built in 1892 by Colonel Eli Lilly and some associates on the site of the Cedar Beach Club. In 1899 Lilly died and the building was sold to Clinton C. Wiggins and his wife Emma followed by the Ballou brothers of Chicago in 1914. In the autumn of 1918 it was destroyed by fire.

=== Wawasee Inn (2) ===
The second Wawasee Inn was not on the north shore as was its predecessor as that site was occupied by the Spinks Wawasee Hotel. The (second) Wawasee Inn was formerly the Tavern Hotel, a 2-story structure erected in 1926 with 26 rooms on the south shore of Lake Wawasee. On April 18, 1955, the inn was gutted by fire. Damage was estimated at $75,000.

=== Spink Wawasee Hotel ===
The Spink Wawasee Hotel was built by the Spink family of Indianapolis in 1925 and was built on the site of the Wawasee Inn Cedar Beach Club. Following the deaths in the Spinks family, the hotel was sold to the Crosier Order of the Roman Catholic Church and after extensive remodeling it opened its doors on August 15, 1948, as Our Lady of the Lake Seminary with Father Leo Kapphahn, OSC, as prior and 118 students. In June 1950 work on a gymnasium was begun. From 1952–1953 a library was completed where the lakeside facing porch in the center of the building was located. In the winter of 1954 an auditorium was constructed. In 1965 the physical plant was purchased and the name of the seminary changed to Wawasee Preparatory and became a coeducational school during the 1970s with Father David Suelzer, OSC, as religious superior and Father Thomas Scheets as principal of Wawasee Prep. Later the seminary was known as Wawasee Prep until it closed its doors the summer of 1975. Today, the former hotel/seminary/prep school is a luxury condominium.

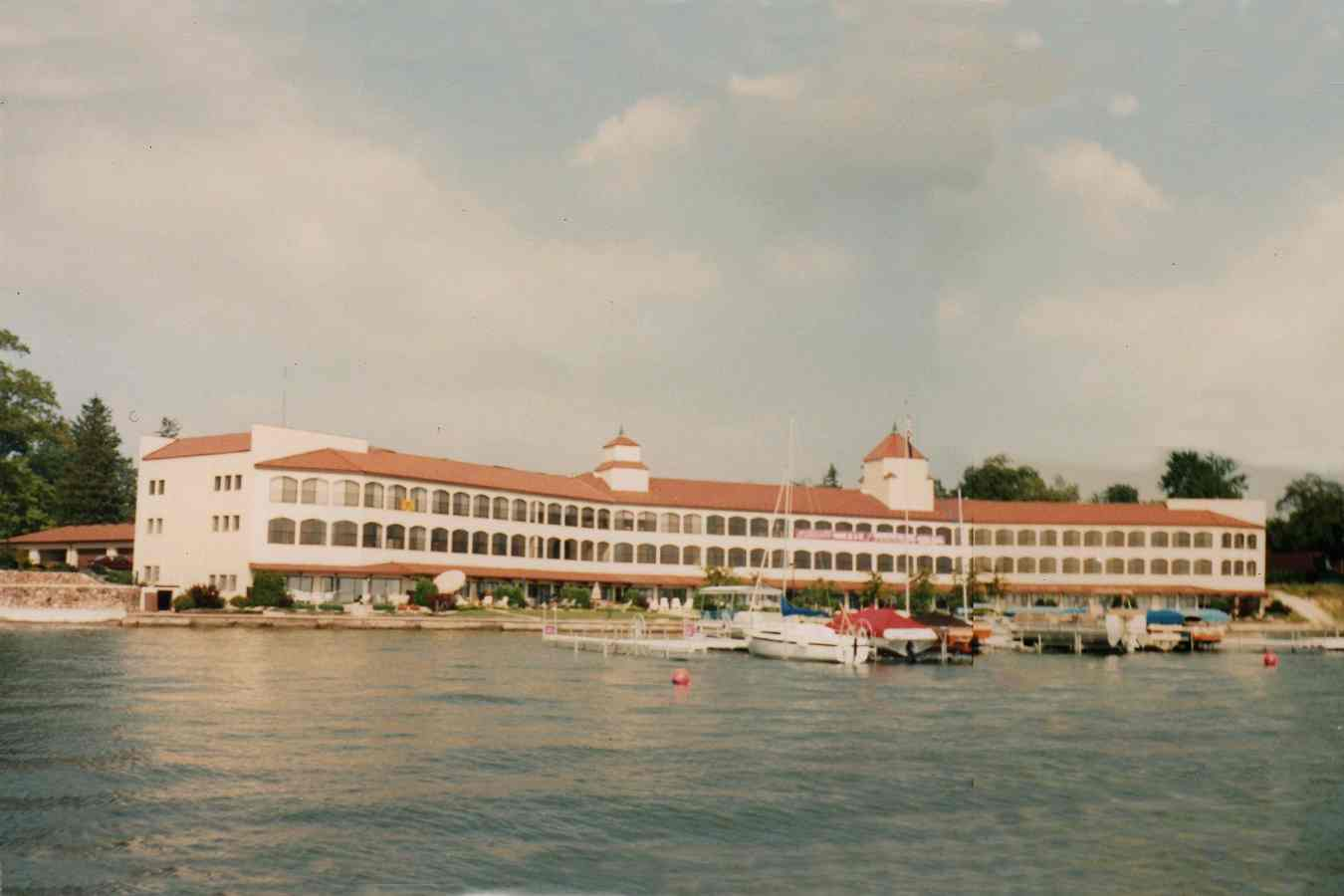
Spink's Wawasee Hotel as a condominium 1989

=== Waco ===
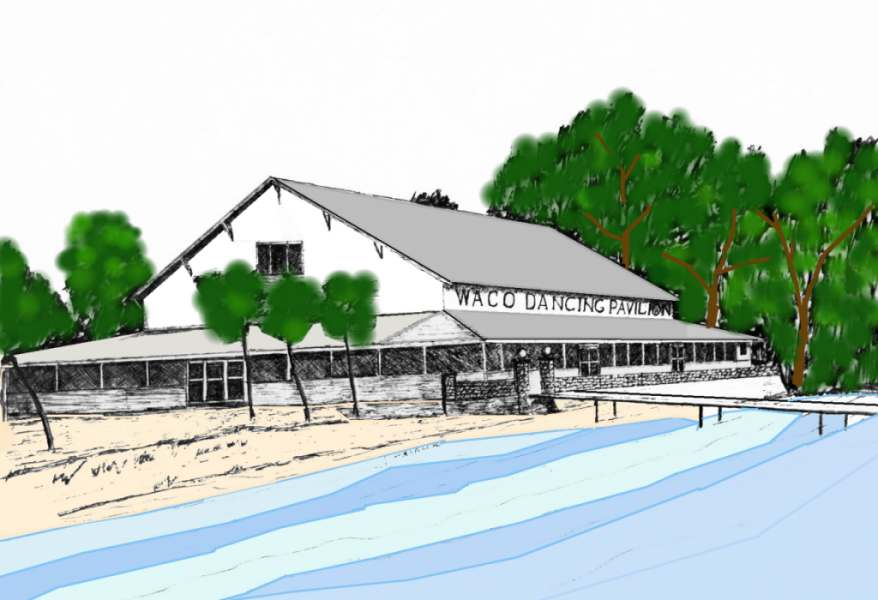
Sketch of Waco around 1940

Waco (Wawasee Amusement Company) was an entertainment hall constructed about 1910 and originally planned as a floating pavilion but this idea was abandoned and it was built on land and located in the Lakeview-South Park area just west of Black Stump Point. Being low-lying land, sand fill was pumped in from the lake bottom. There were no sleeping quarters for the entertainment and orchestras, and help residing in the area used tents during the summer. In 1923 Waco was enlarged and the current road, South Park, was moved further south. Managed by Ross Franklin, Waco was nationally known and pulled in talent such as Hoagy Carmichael, Glenn Miller, Guy Lombardo, Tony Bennett, Ted Weems, Duke Ellington, Spike Jones, Wayne King and Jan Garber. After Ross Franklin no longer associated with Waco, it deteriorated and became a roller skating rink and in the 1960s became a lakeside restaurant with dock and had occasional entertainment. Waco was torn down in the 1970s.

=== Wawassee Yacht Club ===
The Wawasee Yacht Club was established in 1935 after four Snipe sailboat enthusiasts visited Wawasee to see if it was a good sailing lake. They used the front porch of Bishop's Boat Livery and Marine Supply near the Eli Lilly estate as their first meeting place and dock their boats. Currently the club sails 28-foot (8.5 m) E-Scows, 19-foot (5.8 m) Lightnings, and 13-foot (4.0 m) Sunfish class boats in three regattas held from June through early October.

=== Angler's Cove ===
Angler's Cove was a surf and turf restaurant and bar located on N. Ogden Park Road, Ogden Island. The restaurant was popular with boaters in the late 1950s through 1970s and accessible from the channel on the west side of Johnson's Bay.

=== A&W Root Beer stand ===
From the 1950s through the early 80's, Jack's A&W Root Beer Stand on E. Pickwick Drive adjacent to the bridge over the main channel and on the east side of the channel. This root beer stand was accessible by boat and car serving standard hamburger stand fare. At the time, just the A&W, Angler's Cove, and Waco had food available by boat. The A&W is now The Channel Marker Restaurant.

== Boating on Wawasee ==
=== Early boating on Wawasee ===
==== Steamboats ====
- The Anna Jones, a steam tug named after Abram B. Jones' daughter, was purchased in Chicago in the mid-1880s. It was brought to Wawasee via the B&O Railroad and unloaded at the channel between Syracuse Lake and Wawasee. It was then cut in half and a center section added making it roughly 40–45 feet in length.
- The Anna Jones II, a 76-foot (23 m) steam yacht was purchased by Abram Jones about 6 years after the Anna Jones. Capable of holding 100 people, it was the largest boat to ever ply Turkey Lake.
- The Gazelle, brought to Wawasee in 1885 was another steam powered yacht with screw propeller and size of about 70 feet (21 m) with no sail rigging.

==== Sailboats ====
- The Anita was a 20-foot (6 m) sloop built by Higgins & Gifford of Glouschester and owned by Walter Nordyke.
- The La Cigale and sister boat Margaret were designed by Dr. Harry S. Hicks of Indianapolis and were built in the barn behind the Jones Hotel. They were the first flat bottomed scows on Turkey Lake.
- The Keflin, the lakes first fin keel sailing yacht was built behind the Jones Hotel. Its unique feature was a torpedo shaped ballast of several hundred pounds on the keel's end. It was said to be impossible to capsize the Keflin.
- The Mary Louise was a large sail cabin yacht having the largest sail area of any boat on the lake.
- The Eleanor was an 18-foot (5 m) catboat owned by H.S. Tucker and built in Gloucester, Massachusetts.
- The Cynthia was a 20-foot (6 m) sloop sporting 647 square feet (60 m^{2}) of sails and 1 ton of ballast owned by Col. Eli Lilly.
- The Emanon and Leirion were A-Scows built at the start of the 20th century. These two boats participated in the 1901 Inland Lake Yachting Association races at Green Lake, Wisconsin.

== Events ==
=== Proposed draining of Wawasee ===
In the late 1880s a group of farmers owning swampland around Wawasee tried to gain control of the dam at Syracuse with the aim of destroying it to increase their area. The B&O Railroad and Cedar Beach Club defeated the farmers in the Indiana Supreme Court. In 1883 B.F. Crow, who owned the dam and 27 acres (110,000 m^{2}) lying southwest of it, died. A new dam was proposed at Wawasee's outlet near Oakwood Park or near further north on the main channel near the B&O trestle. To ensure success, Colonel Eli Lilly purchased the property for $3000. In 1895 the Syracuse Water Power Company came into existence with stockholders being the B&O Railroad and wealthy cottage owners. Officers of the power company were Mr. Settler, president of the B&O; Col. Eli Lilly as vice-president; a Mr. Blair, secretary; Mr. Ovid Butler, treasurer; and Mr. J.P. Dolan, a Syracuse lawyer as legal council.

=== The abduction of Laura Sargent ===
In the early 20th century Laura Sargent was abducted on the north side of Wawasee by an Ogden's Island resident by the name of Patterson. Patterson and his wife were friends of the Sargents but that friendship soured when the Sargents had taken the side of Mrs. Patterson over Mr. Patterson's drinking problem. Patterson rented a car and employed its owner by posing as a U.S. marshal. The abduction took place when Sargent's buggy was stopped by Patterson and at gunpoint forced into the car leaving the elderly buggy driver behind. Patterson had the driver head for Millersburg. While there, Patterson left the car and during his absence, Mrs. Sargent escaped from the car and hid. By this time, the elderly man alerted authorities and posses were formed. While Patterson drove down the main street of Millersburg searching for Sargent, he came upon one of the posses and pulled out a handgun, opening fire on the posse. Ironically his own brother-in-law was a posse member and shot Patterson in the head.

=== Sturgeon in Wawasee ===
Sturgeon, an elusive, primitive, and rare, fish have been caught on occasion in Wawasee. The first account was around 1855 when Jake Renfro and three others by the last names of Kitson, Etter, and Snyder speared a sturgeon in the main channel between Syracuse Lake and Wawasee. In the 1870s, Jim Jones, the pilot of the steamboat Anna Jones, saw a sturgeon while ice fishing. The latest account was in 1991 when a sturgeon estimated at over 90 pounds was caught and released by a local fisherman, David Riddle. Sturgeon are an endangered species and protected.

=== The Great Wawasee Storm of 1943 ===
On Wednesday, July 21, 1943, a large thunderstorm mushroomed over the southwest tip of Michigan and moved southeast rapidly. At 6:05 pm the storm hit Elkhart ripping trees from the ground and blowing down power lines. By 6:10 the leading edge of the storm had traveled the 10 miles (20 km) from Elkhart to Goshen. In New Paris two 80-foot (24 m) smokestacks weighing 4 short tons each were destroyed. At 6:30 trees were falling in Syracuse and in minutes waves on Wawasee were at 6 feet (2 m) with a driving rain and hail. Six boaters on Wawasee; Sergeant Lloyd Burkholder (25) of Goshen, Dean Yoder (21) of Elkhart, Lloyd Conklin (21) of Goshen, Dorothy Beckerich (21) of Indianapolis, Billie Binkley (20), and Virginia Rush (20), lost their lives.

== Sources ==
- Lilly, Eli. Early Wawasee Days.
