= Wawasee =

Wawasee or Wawaausee often contracted into Wawbee and known as ("Full Moon") was a Miami chief who lived in what is now Kosciusko County, Indiana, in the United States. He was brother to Miami chief Papakeecha.

Wawasee was a signatory to the Treaty of Mississinewas and in the mid-1830s, Wawasee was allotted a small village where the town of Syracuse currently is — situated near the southeast corner of Waubee Lake, approximately two and one-half miles southeast of Milford including the eastern shores of Waubee Lake.

Chief Wawasee, like his brother, was big and strong. He was a minor leader in the Miami tribe but was somewhat significant as brother of Papakeecha. Wawasee dressed up for special occasions by wearing a large silver ring that hung from the cartilage of his nose. He sometimes substituted a fish bone for the ring. Turkey Lake became Lake Wawasee in his honor.

Wawasee is the namesake of both Wawasee, Indiana and Wawasee Village. The high school Wawasee High School located in and serving Syracuse and the surrounding area is also named in Wawasee's honor.

== Sources ==
- Benack, Flat Belly Once Walked These Lands
- Lilly, Eli. Early Wawasee Days. Indianapolis: Studio Press Inc., 1960.
- Armstrong, James W. The History of Leesburg and Plain Township Indiana.
