= Sevastopol, Indiana =

- Unincorporated community
- Location within Indiana Location within the United States
- Coordinates: 41°07′45″N 86°01′08″W
- Country: United States
- State: Indiana
- County: Kosciusko
- Township: Franklin
- Elevation: 879 ft (268 m)
- Time zone: UTC-5 (Eastern (EST))
  - Summer (DST): UTC-4 (EDT)
- ZIP code: 46510
- FIPS code: 18-68760
- GNIS feature ID: 443221

Sevastopol is an unincorporated community in Franklin Township, Kosciusko County, in the U.S. state of Indiana.

== History ==
Sevastopol was platted in 1855. Its name commemorates the Siege of Sevastopol (1854–55). A post office was established at Sevastopol in 1858, and remained in operation until it was discontinued in 1902.

== Geography ==
Sevastopol is located in the far southwest corner of the county, five miles from Mentone, seven from Burket, and 15 from Warsaw, the county seat.
