= Lake Papakeechie =

- Location within Indiana Location within the United States

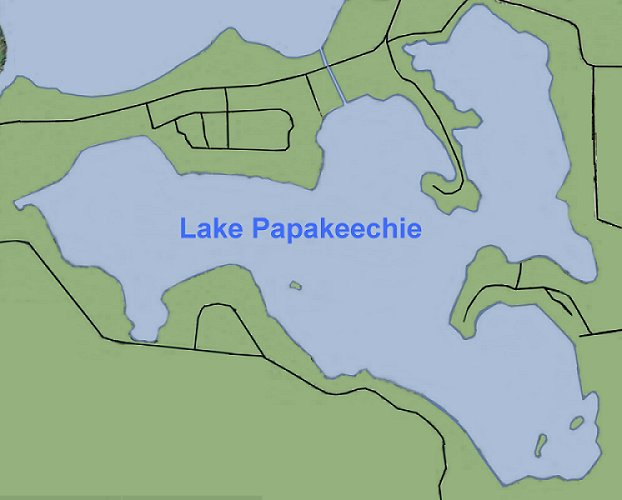
- Diagram of Lake Papakeechie
- Location: Kosciusko County, Indiana
- Coordinates: 41°22′21″N 85°40′13″W
- Type: reservoir
- Catchment area: 5.36 sq mi (13.9 km^{2})
- Basin countries: United States
- Surface area: 179 acres (0.72 km^{2})
- Surface elevation: 863 ft (263 m)

Lake Papakeechie is a small man-made lake of 179 acres (0.72 km^{2}) located in Kosciusko County, Indiana, United States. The lake is situated south of and drains into Lake Wawasee. The lake is owned by the Papakeechie Protective Association.

== History ==
Lake Papakeechie is named after Miami chief Papakeecha or Pa-hed-ke-teh-a, the most influential chief in the region around Lake Wawasee.

Papakeechie was created just before 1910 in the same location and in a basin where six small lakes once occupied this area. The small lakes were named Jarret's, Gan's, Hooper's and three named Hartzell's. Early in the 19th century a fish trap or fish weir was constructed at the outlet where water flowed to Lake Wawasee where settlers would easily catch fish. The lake (with dam) was deemed completed in 1913.

When an 8 foot (2.4 m) earthen dam was constructed by Charles A. Sudlow of Indianapolis on that north side, the water level rose elevating large masses of vegetation. These were loaded with rocks and filled with holes and sunk to the bottom.

A 1931 Syracuse Chamber of Commerce booklet shows 69 homes on the lake. Today, there are close to 400 houses around the lake, 300 of those on the lake front. There are still a few undeveloped lots owned by individuals adjacent to existing property and a wedge of wooded area. The lots, 50 feet (15 m) wide with various depths, were sold for $500 each. The 5 miles (8.0 km) of shoreline was known as “good for fishing.” The booklet, possibly used as a sales tool, provided the legend, topography, history, information about the hatcheries, the corporation and approaches, complete with photos of the various areas and survey of the property.

=== The Legend ===
The legend states three small tribes of the Great Potowattamie family often settled around the largest lake in the region. The largest and most powerful tribe occupied Conklin Hill, overlooking the lake from the west and their chieftain's name was “Wawasee.” When a map of the region was made, it was seen two lakes formed a turkey with a monstrous head with the streams as whiskers. Thus the original name of Turkey Lake.

=== Six Lakes ===
High hills, deep holes, swamps and razorback ridges made up the landscape. The deep holes were full of water and full of fish, yet the terrain around made the water inaccessible. The mounds, promontories and most of the border were covered with second growth timber 40–60 feet high. Six of these little lakes from 5–20 acres (2.0–8.1 ha) in extent and from 40–100 foot (12–30 m) in depth were scattered about the valley. Sudlow had a dream of “A Sportsman’s Paradise.”

=== History ===
Sudlow organized The Northern Indiana Improvement Company and bought the land within and surrounding the valley with the little lakes. The company constructed several dams aggregating 1,900 foot (580 m) in length, across the several openings and within a few rods of the shores of Wawasee. Wells were driven on all sides of the valley, tapping the artesian wells producing a lake with a level about nine feet above the level of Wawasee across the highway.

=== The hatcheries ===
In 1914 the State Commissioner of Fisheries and Game discovered a sufficient flow of water was constant from Papakeechie into Wawasee to conduct the hatching of fish on a large scale. A 4 acres (1.6 ha) tract was leased from the Northern Indiana Improvement Company for the hatcheries. It also acquired title to several acres below the dam and constructed 12 ponds, one-half acre each, which the waters from Papakeechie step down a distance of about 4 feet (1.2 m) and as drainage is needed, steps down into Wawasee, “making a most perfect system for the hatching of fresh water fish.” The lease required the state to perpetually maintain the dams to Lake Papakeechie and to pay as rental, for the use of water, 5,000 number two fingerling bass, annually, in addition to an apportionment of the surplus bass and other fish hatched, same as furnished to public lakes of the same size. The state kept its word.

=== Corporation ===
Upon the death of Sudlow in 1915, his will established a Trust Company of Indianapolis as trustee of his estate. The company came into possession of nearly all the stock of the improvement company and for six years Papakeechie remained dormant. In 1921, the Northern Indiana Improvement Company parted with the title to the entire property to Thomas J. Prickett of Nappanee, who in turn sold it to Papakeechie Corporation, which had been formed and organized for the purpose of taking over the property. The corporation filed plats of the land surrounding the lake, subdividing them into suitable lots for summer homes. More than 200 acres (81 ha) of the land belonging to the company remained unplatted and not for sale in 1923. Wild ducks were reported in great numbers. Nearly 100 lots were disposed of during the first year of the corporation's management.

Papakeechie Lake, in 1923, could only be reached by public conveyance over the Baltimore & Ohio Railway to Wawasee and then by boat to Papakeechie. The corporation began building roads around the lake and in the brochure stated it would have a boulevard surrounding it.

== Papakeechie mystery ==
From the 1950s through late 1960s an aluminum airplane wheel with tire measuring some 7 to 8 feet (2 m) across lay on the shore of Papakeechie just to the east of the dam. It was never known how the piece of landing gear got there as it would have had to have been rolled up hill and over the earthen part of the dam. Some said it was dropped from an airplane but that theory was never confirmed. This tire from 1976 until 1980, was still present at the end of Hiawatha lane. Which at the time was not a road, but was a dirt hiking path out into the lake. No houses existed along the path or near the tire, it was about 10 feet in diameter and was made by Goodyear as it was prominently marked. The tire was shiny, as the rubber was old, and very hard. People would easily sit on the tire, it protruded into the lake. It was hidden by trees in summer. It may have washed up in this spot.

== Hydrology and characteristics ==
Papakeechie has a drainage area of 5.36 sq mi (13.9 km^{2}). The dam length is 2,460 feet (750 m). It has a maximum discharge of 291 ft^{3}/s (8.2 m^{3}/s). Normal storage is 890 acre-feet (1,100,000 m^{3}). The Indiana Department of Natural Resources (DNR) is the state regulating agency.

The Papakeechie Protective Association was formerly embroiled in controversy with the Indiana Department of Natural Resources, which asserted that the association's dam and levees were badly outdated, unsafe, and not in conformity with federal and state law. The DNR had threatened to breach the dam if the association failed to fix and enhance its dam and levees as required. Engineering experts estimated that the cost for this project could exceed as much as $800,000. In 2012, the association successfully completed the rebuilding of its levee system to the satisfaction of the state of Indiana.

== Chief Papakeechie ==
Papakeechie, or, more properly, Papakeecha, or, still more so, Pa-hed-ke-teh-a, was the name of the most influential Miami chief in the region around Lake Wawasee. His name is prosaically translated, "Flat Belly". At the time of the arrival of the white man, he was about sixty years old and was described as of a dark copper color, inclined to corpulency, and given to wearing a silver ring or a fish bone through the cartilage of his nose. He was a brother of Wau-wa-aus-see and, like most of the chiefs in this part of the country, claimed to have fought in the Battle of Tippecanoe.

His reservation, ceded to him in 1828 and returned to the government in 1834, had an area of thirty-six square miles, being six miles square. Its western boundary, drawn north and south, almost bisected Lake Wawasee. The present sites of Our Lady of the Lake Seminary and the South Shore Inn lie just within the western edge of this old reservation. His Indian village in Noble County, and the brick house built for him by the government, to fulfill a treaty provision, was about a mile and one-half northwest of Indian Village. And occasional piece of brick from the house still may be found in a field there.

After 1834 Papakeechie's entire reservation was included in the million and one-half acres of Indiana lands given by the government to the Wabash and Erie Canal. Later it was sold and the proceeds squandered in that ill-fated project. The chief died between 1838 and 1840, and the burial ground where he rests with a number of his villagers may be found by following Road 8, leading eastward from the north-east corner of the lake named in his honor to the point where it jogs to the north. Here, close by, to the east of the first turn, is a low, swampy woodland, just beyond the southeast corner of which, on higher open ground, as the cemetery, now only indicated by slight undulations in the ground.

== Books on Papakeechie ==
- Giese, Vincent J., Lead Thou Me on: Reflections from Lake Papakeechie. Our Sunday Visitor, Huntington, Indiana, U.S.A., 1993.
- Leffers, Laura. Dance on the Water. Book World/Blue Star, 1996. ISBN 1-881542-10-6, ISBN 978-1-881542-10-0.

== Sources ==
- Lilly, Eli. Early Wawasee Days. Indianapolis: Studio Press Inc., 1960.
- U.S. Lakes Info
- Indiana Historical Bureau
- Lake Wawasee and Syracuse Lake Diagnostic Study
- 24d.org
