= Gravelton =

Gravelton may refer to:

- Gravelton, Indiana
- Gravelton, Missouri
