= Indian Village, Noble County, Indiana =

Indian Village
- Unincorporated community
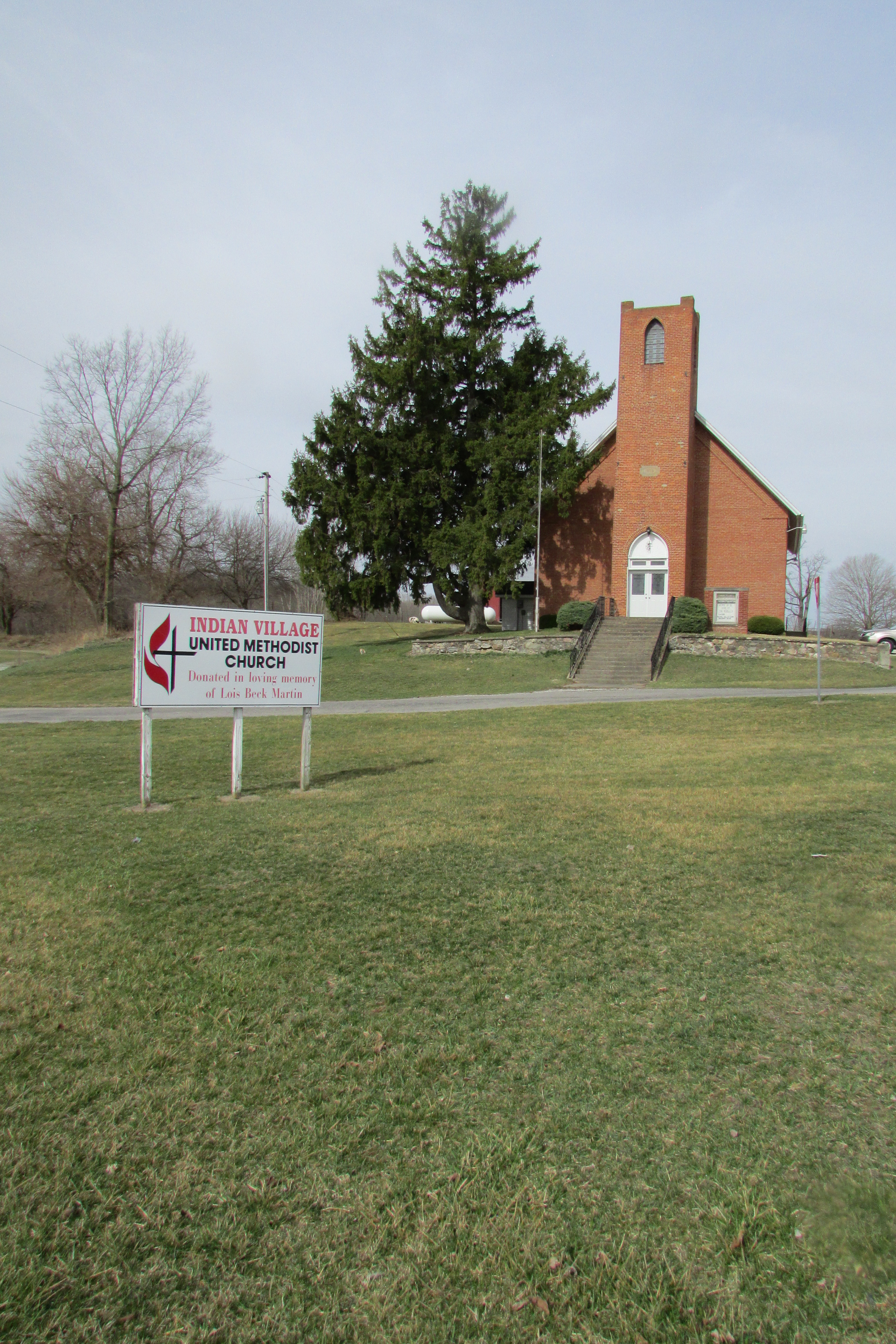
- Indian Village United Methodist Church, originally built as a United Brethren Church.

- Location within Indiana Location within the United States
- Coordinates: 41°21′57″N 85°38′22″W
- Country: United States
- State: Indiana
- County: Noble
- Township: Sparta
- Elevation: 886 ft (270 m)
- Time zone: UTC-5 (Eastern (EST))
  - Summer (DST): UTC-4 (EDT)
- ZIP code: 46732
- Area code: 260
- GNIS feature ID: 450549

Indian Village (formerly known as Alcinda) is a small unincorporated community in Sparta Township, Noble County, in the U.S. state of Indiana.

== History ==
A post office was established at Indian Village in 1867, and remained in operation until 1888. The community is noted for being the Indian reservation residence of Miami chief Papakeecha who lived in a one-story brick home there from 1827 through 1834.

== Geography ==
Indian Village is located 1.5 miles south of Cromwell and 2 miles east of Lake Wawasee at the junction of Indiana State Road 5 and County Road W 100 N.
