= Turkey Creek Township, Kosciusko County, Indiana =

Turkey Creek Township
- Township
- Coordinates: 41°23′43″N 85°42′43″W
- Country: United States
- State: Indiana
- County: Kosciusko

Government
  - Type: Indiana township

Area
  - Total: 35.36 sq mi (91.6 km^{2})
  - Land: 28.61 sq mi (74.1 km^{2})
  - Water: 6.76 sq mi (17.5 km^{2})
- Elevation: 873 ft (266 m)

Population (2020)
  - Total: 8,659
  - Density: 294.6/sq mi (113.7/km^{2})
- Time zone: UTC-5 (Eastern (EST))
  - Summer (DST): UTC-4 (EDT)
- FIPS code: 18-76760
- GNIS feature ID: 453904

Turkey Creek Township is one of seventeen townships in Kosciusko County, Indiana. As of the 2020 census, its population was 8,659 (up from 8,428 at 2010) and it contained 5,497 housing units.

Turkey Creek Township was organized in 1836.

== Geography ==
According to the 2010 census, the township has a total area of 35.36 square miles (91.6 km^{2}), of which 28.61 square miles (74.1 km^{2}) (or 80.91%) is land and 6.76 square miles (17.5 km^{2}) (or 19.12%) is water.

=== Cities and towns ===
- Syracuse

=== Unincorporated towns ===
- Buttermilk Point at 41.3772696°N 85.6741534°W
- Cedar Point at 41.3978255°N 85.6752647°W
- Marineland Gardens at 41.3781029°N 85.6844314°W
- Quaker Haven Park at 41.3669912°N 85.7605448°W
- South Park at 41.4008809°N 85.7210994°W
- Wawasee at 41.4239370°N 85.6958210°W
- Wawasee Village at 41.4144921°N 85.7474892°W

(This list is based on USGS data and may include former settlements.)

== Education ==
Turkey Creek Township residents may obtain a free library card from the Syracuse-Turkey Creek Township Public Library in Syracuse.
