= Seward Township, Kosciusko County, Indiana =

Seward Township
- Township
- Coordinates: 41°06′29″N 85°56′46″W
- Country: United States
- State: Indiana
- County: Kosciusko

Government
  - Type: Indiana township

Area
  - Total: 36.27 sq mi (93.9 km^{2})
  - Land: 34.98 sq mi (90.6 km^{2})
  - Water: 1.3 sq mi (3.4 km^{2})
- Elevation: 876 ft (267 m)

Population (2020)
  - Total: 2,280
  - Density: 73.4/sq mi (28.3/km^{2})
- Time zone: UTC-5 (Eastern (EST))
  - Summer (DST): UTC-4 (EDT)
- FIPS code: 18-68796
- GNIS feature ID: 453840

Seward Township is one of seventeen townships in Kosciusko County, Indiana, United States. As of the 2020 census, its population was 2,280 (down from 2,567 at 2010) and it contained 1,357 housing units.

Seward Township was organized in 1859.

== Geography ==
According to the 2010 census, the township has a total area of 36.27 square miles (93.9 km^{2}), of which 34.98 square miles (90.6 km^{2}) (or 96.44%) is land and 1.3 square miles (3.4 km^{2}) (or 3.58%) is water.

=== Cities and towns ===
- Burket
