= Franklin Township, Kosciusko County, Indiana =

Franklin Township
- Township
- Coordinates: 41°07′19″N 86°01′43″W
- Country: United States
- State: Indiana
- County: Kosciusko

Government
  - Type: Indiana township

Area
  - Total: 34.37 sq mi (89.0 km^{2})
  - Land: 34.21 sq mi (88.6 km^{2})
  - Water: 0.16 sq mi (0.41 km^{2})
- Elevation: 879 ft (268 m)

Population (2020)
  - Total: 1,121
  - Density: 32.9/sq mi (12.7/km^{2})
- Time zone: UTC-5 (Eastern (EST))
  - Summer (DST): UTC-4 (EDT)
- FIPS code: 18-25486
- GNIS feature ID: 453307

Franklin Township is one of seventeen townships in Kosciusko County, Indiana. As of the 2020 census, its population was 1,121 (a tiny decline of 1,127 from 2010) and it contained 436 housing units.

Franklin Township was organized in 1838.

== Geography ==
As of the 2010 census, the township spans a total area of 34.37 square miles (89.0 km^{2}), with 34.21 square miles (88.6 km^{2}), or 99.53%, consisting of land, and 0.16 square miles (0.41 km^{2}), or 0.47%, covered by water.

=== Cities and towns ===
- Mentone (south side)

=== Unincorporated towns ===
- Beaver Dam at 41.0861547°N 86.0133281°W
- Lowman Corner at 41.0705991°N 86.0183280°W
- Sevastopol at 41.1292104°N 86.0188844°W

(This list is based on USGS data and may include former settlements.)
