= Syracuse Lake =

Lake in Indiana, United States

- Location within Indiana Location within the United States

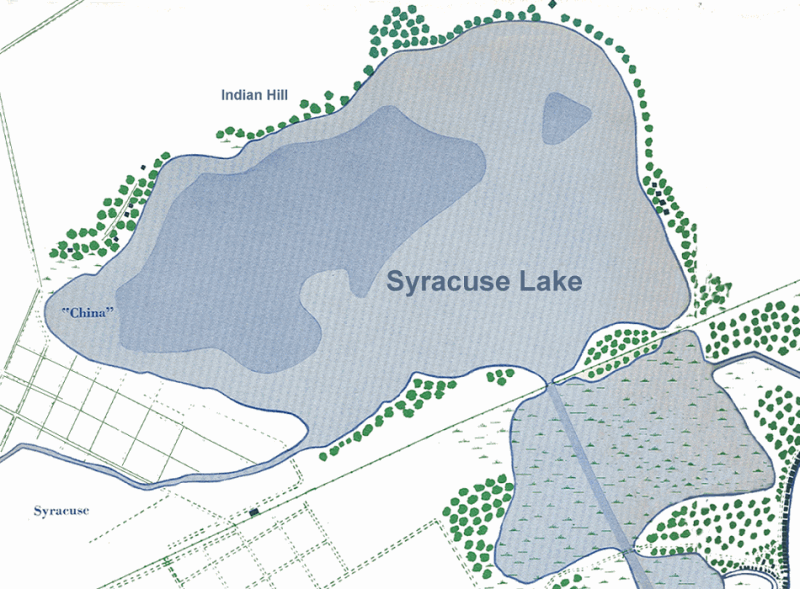
- 1910 map of Syracuse Lake
- Location: Kosciusko County, Indiana, United States
- Coordinates: 41°25′36″N 85°44′13″W
- Basin countries: United States
- Surface area: 1.67 km^{2} (410 acres)
- Average depth: 3.9 m (13 ft)
- Max. depth: 10 m (33 ft)
- Surface elevation: 261 m (856 ft)

Syracuse Lake is a natural lake bordering Syracuse in Kosciusko County, Indiana, United States.

== Location ==
Syracuse Lake is bordered on the west by N. Front Street, Pickwick Road and the B&O Railroad on the south. On the east it is bordered by E. Shore Drive and on the north by E. Northshore Drive. It connects to Lake Wawasee by a channel on the south end.

== Hydrology ==
Syracuse Lake is classified as a Trophic Class 1 lake, having a eutrophication index value of 10.

The lake is typical in structure of natural lakes of the glaciated portions of the upper Midwest. The lake is presently healthy and has a balanced aquatic ecosystem (WAW 1995). It has a surface area of 1.67 km^{2} (410 acres) with a maximum depth of 10 m (33 ft) and an average depth of 3.9 m (13 ft).

== History ==
=== Pre-glaciation ===
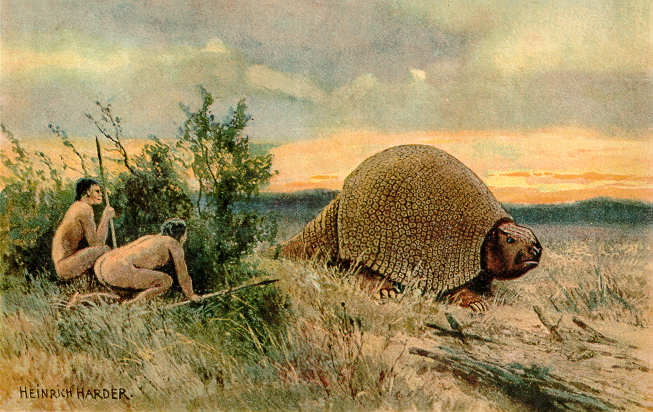
Drawing depicting a Glyptodon

Around 1 million years ago, just prior to the Pleistocene epoch, northern Indiana was covered by the Teays River system, which flowed northwest out of Virginia, West Virginia, and Ohio, entering Indiana at Adams County and flowing about 49 miles south of what is now Syracuse Lake.

=== Post-glaciation ===
After the last glaciation period, the land was left with kettle holes and hilly moraines. The land supported large vast Picea evergreen forests and balsam poplar, which gave way to hardwoods of oak and hickory. Animal life included Glyptodon, saber-toothed cat, mastodon, short-faced bear, dire wolf, ground sloth, giant beaver, peccary, stag-moose and ancient bison. Lakes would have sturgeon, whitefish, pike, pickerel, and muskellunge.

=== Human inhabitation ===
The ground around Syracuse Lake and Syracuse was first settled by the people of the Glacial Kame culture, who would leave behind artifacts and burial sites.

=== The Syracuse dugout ===
In 1959, Dick Jamison of Syracuse was fishing in 4 or 5 feet (1.2 or 1.5 m) of water just off the southeast shore. He saw beneath the water what he thought was a large, water-soaked log, with one end protruding from the green algae moss. He and his father returned and removed moss, marl, and slime, exposing a blackened dugout canoe made of a tulip tree, measuring 21 feet (6.4 m) and between 3–4 feet (91–122 cm) wide. Age and exposure had rotted away most of the boat's sides. It was thought that the canoe belonged to Miami Indians or fur traders, or by very early settlers, and that it was abandoned on the old shore before the lake was raised by a dam built in 1834.

=== Indian Hill ===
Indian Hill is located on the north shore of Syracuse Lake, 1.5 miles to the east of the town of Syracuse. It was a cemetery for the Indians of the area, who interred their dead in trees. Eventually the wrapping around the dead would disintegrate, causing the skeletal remains to fall to the ground.

=== Accounts of sturgeon ===
In 1912, Bing Raymond caught a 32-inch (810 mm) sturgeon in Lake Syracuse off the lake's extreme northwest side, near a place called China. Another sturgeon was seen about the same year by four men. The third account occurred in the 1920s, when Charlotte White discovered a disabled sturgeon measuring 7 feet (2.1 m), 3 inches and weighing 130 lb, suffocated by a pair of waterwings caught in its gills.

== Current population ==
Syracuse, like its neighbor, Lake Wawasee, is lined with many homes used seasonally and by those who live there year-round.
