= Jefferson Township, Kosciusko County, Indiana =

Jefferson Township
- Township
- Coordinates: 41°23′27″N 85°56′03″W
- Country: United States
- State: Indiana
- County: Kosciusko

Government
  - Type: Indiana township

Area
  - Total: 31.52 sq mi (81.6 km^{2})
  - Land: 31.47 sq mi (81.5 km^{2})
  - Water: 0.06 sq mi (0.16 km^{2})
- Elevation: 827 ft (252 m)

Population (2020)
  - Total: 1,963
  - Density: 64.8/sq mi (25.0/km^{2})
- Time zone: UTC-5 (Eastern (EST))
  - Summer (DST): UTC-4 (EDT)
- FIPS code: 18-38052
- GNIS feature ID: 453489

Historical population
Census	Pop.	Note	%±
1930	1,055		—
1940	1,038		−1.6%
1950	929		−10.5%
1960	1,004		8.1%
1970	1,001		−0.3%
1980	1,089		8.8%
1990	1,201		10.3%
2000	1,648		37.2%
2010	2,040		23.8%
2020	1,963		−3.8%
US Census:

Jefferson Township is one of seventeen townships in Kosciusko County, Indiana. As of the 2020 census, its population was 1,963 (down from 2,040 at 2010) and it contained 656 housing units.

== History ==
Jefferson Township was organized in 1838.

== Geography ==
According to the 2010 census, the township has a total area of 31.52 square miles (81.6 km^{2}), of which 31.47 square miles (81.5 km^{2}) (or 99.84%) is land and 0.06 square miles (0.16 km^{2}) (or 0.19%) is water.

=== Cities and towns ===
- Nappanee (partial)

=== Unincorporated towns ===
- Gravelton at 41.4358810°N 85.9241624°W
- Hastings at 41.3836579°N 85.9294398°W

(This list is based on USGS data and may include former settlements.)
