= Beaver Dam, Indiana =

- Unincorporated community
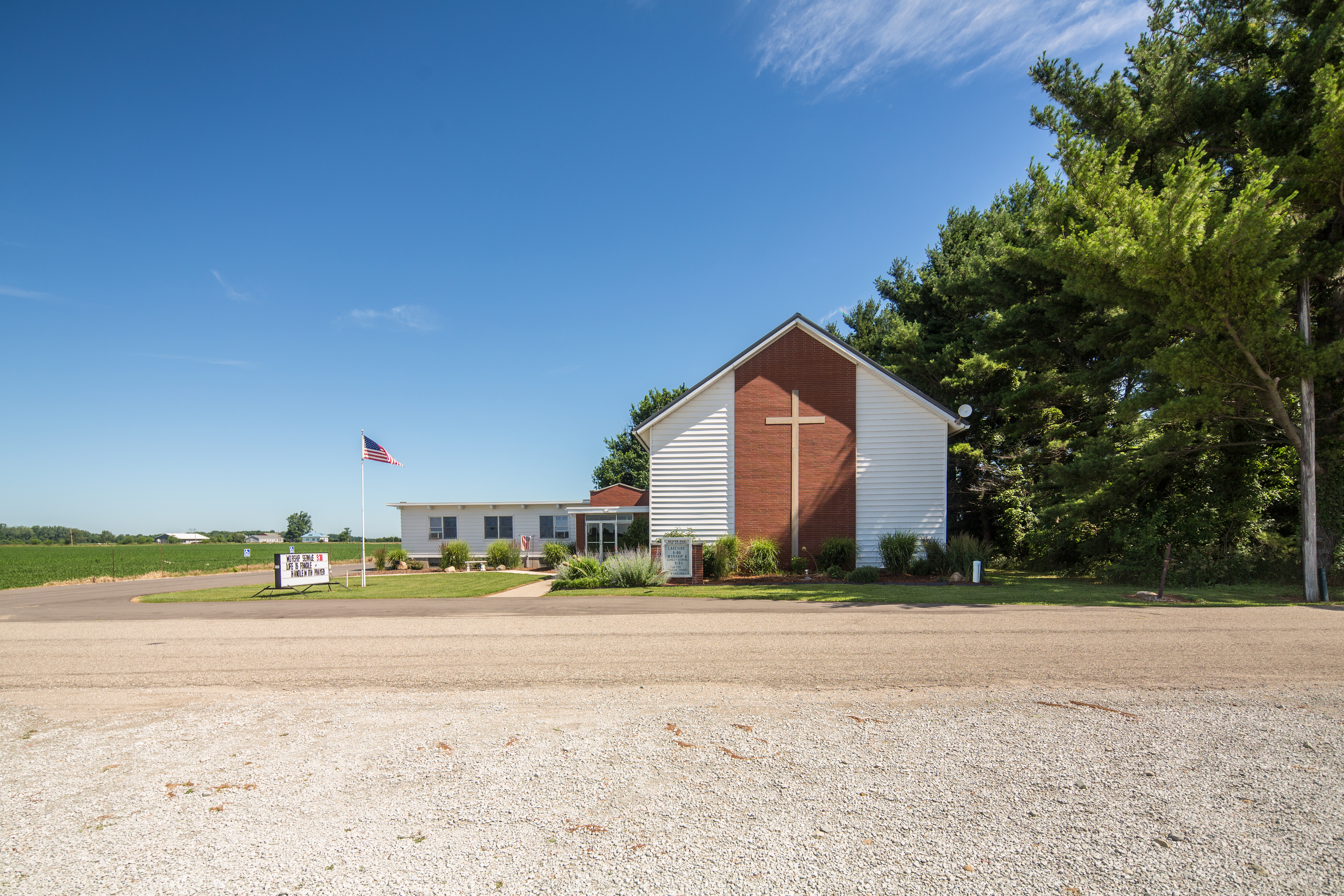

- Location within Indiana Location within the United States
- Coordinates: 41°05′10″N 86°00′48″W
- Country: United States
- State: Indiana
- County: Kosciusko
- Township: Franklin
- Elevation: 896 ft (273 m)
- Time zone: UTC-5 (Eastern (EST))
  - Summer (DST): UTC-4 (EDT)
- ZIP code: 46910
- FIPS code: 18-04024
- GNIS feature ID: 430677

Beaver Dam is an unincorporated community in Franklin Township, Kosciusko County, in the U.S. state of Indiana.

== History ==
Beaver Dam (previously spelled Beaverdam) contained a post office from 1844 until 1901. A beaver dam on the nearby creek caused the name to be selected.

== Demographics ==
The United States Census Bureau delineated Beaver Dam as a census designated place in the 2022 American Community Survey.
