= Hastings, Indiana =

- Unincorporated community
- Location within Indiana Location within the United States
- Coordinates: 41°23′01″N 85°55′46″W
- Country: United States
- State: Indiana
- County: Kosciusko
- Township: Jefferson
- Elevation: 837 ft (255 m)
- Time zone: UTC-5 (Eastern (EST))
  - Summer (DST): UTC-4 (EDT)
- ZIP code: 46542
- FIPS code: 18-32476
- GNIS feature ID: 435865

Hastings is an unincorporated community in Jefferson Township, Kosciusko County, in the U.S. state of Indiana.

== History ==
A post office was established at Hastings in 1891, and remained in operation until it was discontinued in 1903. The name of the community likely honors a family of settlers.
