= Papakeecha =

Papakeecha (c. 1770 – 1837; Miami-Illinois: Pa-hed-ke-teh-a, lit. 'flat belly') was the most influential Miami chief in the region around Lake Wawasee, in what is now Kosciusko County, Indiana, United States leading his people from 1820 until 1837. Lake Papakeechie was named after him.

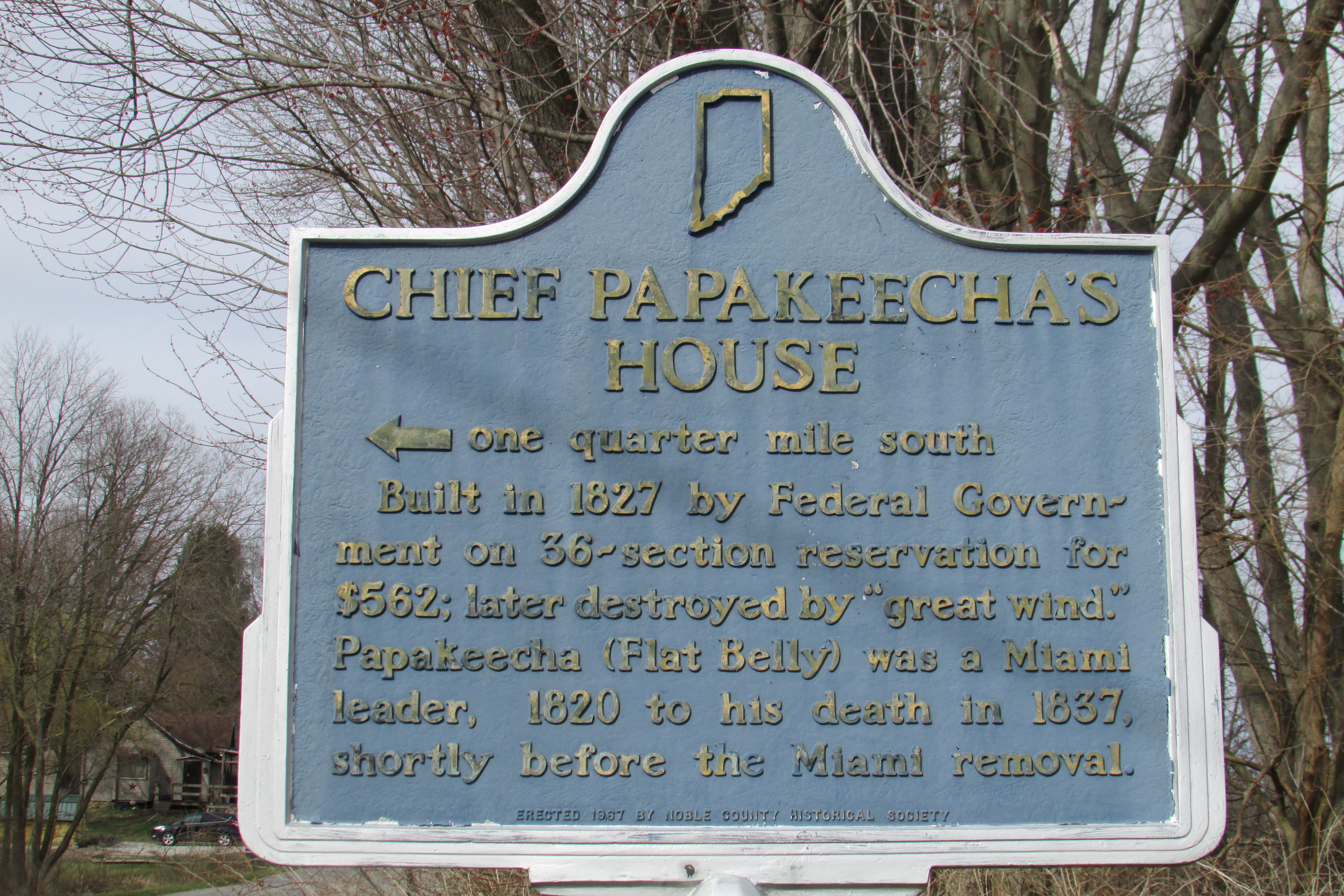
Historic marker at Papakeecha's house, Noble County.

Papakeecha was about 60 years old when white men entered the area. His skin was described as "dark copper" in color, and he wore a silver ring through his nose. Historical accounts have him weighing 300 lb (140 kg). He claimed to have participated in the 1811 Battle of Tippecanoe. In 1828 he was given reservation land totalling 36 square miles (93 km^{2}) which nearly bisected Lake Wawasee north to south. He was the brother of Miami chief Wawasee (Wau-wa-aus-see), who Lake Wawasee was named after.

His reservation town was located near present-day Indian Village in Noble County and had some 75 residents. The United States government built him a one-story brick house in 1827 for $562, located in the southeast corner of his village, which was later destroyed by a tornado or "great wind" as the historical marker indicates. This marker was erected in 1967 by the Noble County Historical Society.

Another marker by the Indiana Historical Society 1962 states: You are now leaving Papakeechie's Reservation, 36 square miles (93 km^{2}). This Miami Chief, also known as Flat Belly, held this land from 1828 to 1834 when it was returned to the National Government in the Treaty at the Forks of the Wabash. It was later owned by the Wabash & Erie Canal.

In 1834, Papakeecha's reservation land was included in a 1,500,000-acre (6,100 km^{2}) land deal benefiting the Wabash and Erie Canal.

Papakeecha died in 1837. His burial place is with a number of his villagers on the northeast side of Lake Papakeechee.(see Find A Grave).
