= Wooster, Kosciusko County, Indiana =

Wooster
- Unincorporated community and Census designated place
- Location within Indiana Location within the United States
- Coordinates: 41°12′26″N 85°44′45″W
- Country: United States
- State: Indiana
- County: Kosciusko
- Township: Washington
- Elevation: 886 ft (270 m)
- Time zone: UTC-5 (Eastern (EST))
  - Summer (DST): UTC-4 (EDT)
- ZIP code: 46562
- FIPS code: 18-85562
- GNIS feature ID: 2830434

Wooster, formerly known as Kosciusko, is an unincorporated community in Washington Township, Kosciusko County, in the U.S. state of Indiana.

== History ==
A post office was established at Wooster in 1854, and remained in operation until it was discontinued in 1903.

== Demographics ==
Historical population
Census	Pop.	Note	%±
2023 (est.)	168

The United States Census Bureau defined Wooster as a census designated place in the 2022 American Community Survey.
