= Palestine, Kosciusko County, Indiana =

Palestine
- Unincorporated community and Census designated place
- Location within Indiana Location within the United States
- Coordinates: 41°10′36″N 85°56′34″W
- Country: United States
- State: Indiana
- County: Kosciusko
- Township: Harrison
- Elevation: 817 ft (249 m)
- Time zone: UTC-5 (Eastern (EST))
  - Summer (DST): UTC-4 (EDT)
- ZIP code: 46539
- FIPS code: 18-57672
- GNIS feature ID: 2830433

Palestine or Palestine Lake is an unincorporated community in Harrison Township, Kosciusko County, in the U.S. state of Indiana.

== History ==
Palestine was laid out in 1837. It was named for the ancient area of Palestine. A post office was established at Palestine in 1839, and remained in operation until it was discontinued in 1903.

== Geography ==
Palestine is located along State Road 25 six miles southwest of the city of Warsaw. It occupies the western shore of Palestine Lake. Trimble Creek joins the lake at the northern edge of town.

== Demographics ==
The United States Census Bureau defined Palestine as a census designated place in the 2022 American Community Survey.
