= Tippecanoe Township, Kosciusko County, Indiana =

Tippecanoe Township
- Township
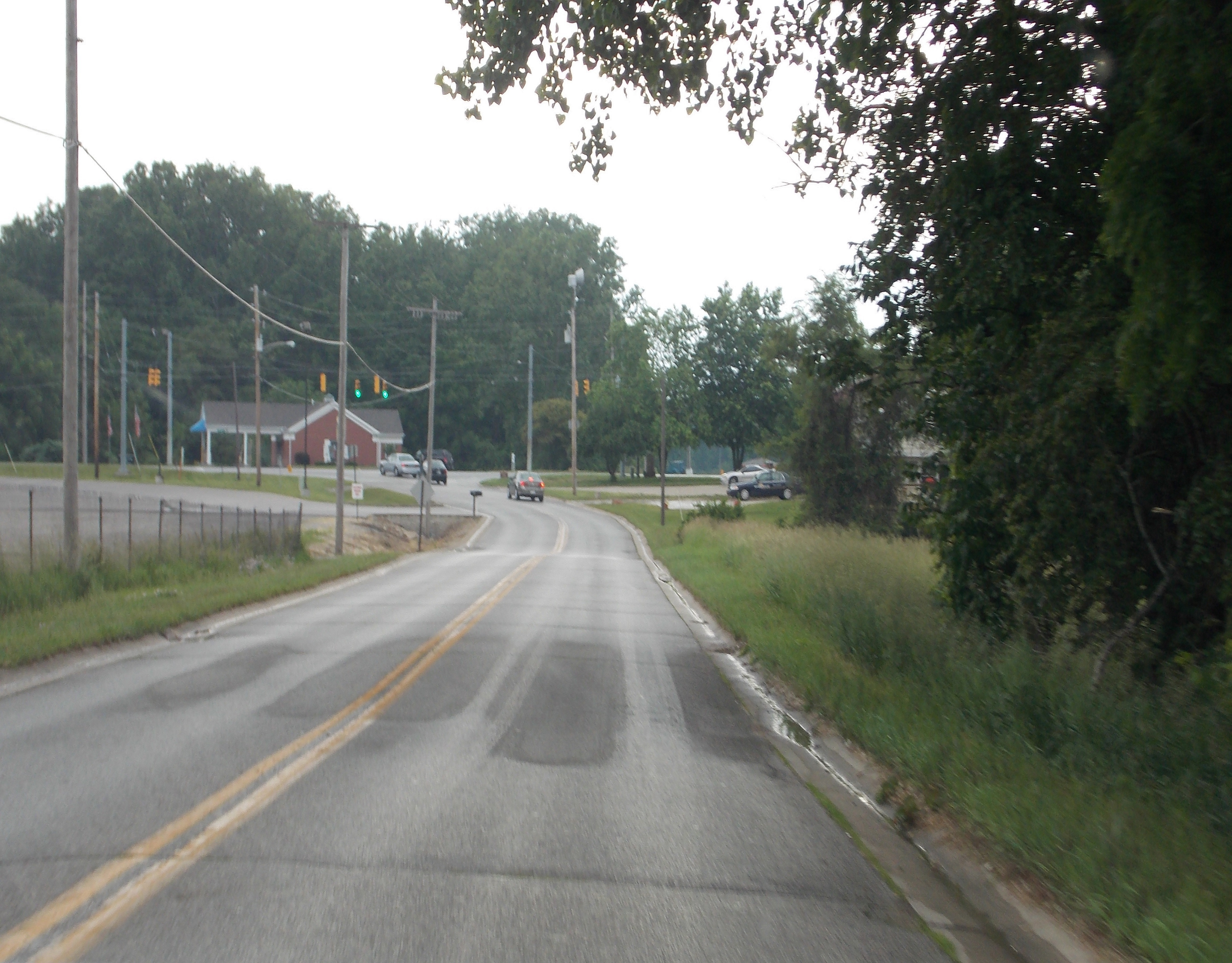
- Looking west on Epworth Forest Road in North Webster, in Tippecanoe Township

- Coordinates: 41°18′46″N 85°42′30″W
- Country: United States
- State: Indiana
- County: Kosciusko

Government
  - Type: Indiana township

Area
  - Total: 35.11 sq mi (90.9 km^{2})
  - Land: 30.32 sq mi (78.5 km^{2})
  - Water: 4.79 sq mi (12.4 km^{2})
- Elevation: 860 ft (262 m)

Population (2020)
  - Total: 6,576
  - Density: 219.7/sq mi (84.8/km^{2})
- Time zone: UTC-5 (Eastern (EST))
  - Summer (DST): UTC-4 (EDT)
- FIPS code: 18-75842
- GNIS feature ID: 453895

Tippecanoe Township is one of seventeen townships in Kosciusko County, Indiana. As of the 2020 census, its population was 6,576 (down from 6,661 at 2010) and it contained 4,862 housing units.

Tippecanoe Township was organized in 1838.

== Geography ==
According to the 2010 census, the township has a total area of 35.11 square miles (90.9 km^{2}), of which 30.32 square miles (78.5 km^{2}) (or 86.36%) is land and 4.79 square miles (12.4 km^{2}) (or 13.64%) is water.

=== Cities and towns ===
- North Webster

=== Unincorporated towns ===
- Barbee at 41.2908790°N 85.7122093°W
- Forest Glen at 41.3267128°N 85.7636001°W
- Kalorama Park at 41.3344906°N 85.7608222°W
- Lakeview Spring at 41.2864347°N 85.6880420°W
- Walker Park at 41.3294905°N 85.7533219°W
- Yellowbanks at 41.3217131°N 85.6788753°W

(This list is based on USGS data and may include former settlements.)

== Education ==
Tippecanoe Township residents may obtain a free library card from the North Webster Community Public Library in North Webster.
