= Washington Township, Kosciusko County, Indiana =

Washington Township
- Township
- Coordinates: 41°12′59″N 85°42′31″W
- Country: United States
- State: Indiana
- County: Kosciusko

Government
  - Type: Indiana township

Area
  - Total: 35.43 sq mi (91.8 km^{2})
  - Land: 34.86 sq mi (90.3 km^{2})
  - Water: 0.58 sq mi (1.5 km^{2})
- Elevation: 909 ft (277 m)

Population (2020)
  - Total: 3,025
  - Density: 86/sq mi (33/km^{2})
- Time zone: UTC-5 (Eastern (EST))
  - Summer (DST): UTC-4 (EDT)
- FIPS code: 18-80756
- GNIS feature ID: 454003

Washington Township is one of seventeen townships in Kosciusko County, Indiana. As of the 2020 census, its population was 3,025 (up from 2,996 at 2010) and it contained 1,344 housing units.

== History ==
Washington Township was organized in 1838.

The Robert Orr Polygonal Barn was listed on the National Register of Historic Places in 1993.

== Geography ==
According to the 2010 census, the township has a total area of 35.43 square miles (91.8 km^{2}), of which 34.86 square miles (90.3 km^{2}) (or 98.39%) is land and 0.58 square miles (1.5 km^{2}) (or 1.64%) is water.

=== Cities and towns ===
- Pierceton

=== Unincorporated towns ===
- Wooster at 41.2092115°N 85.7427650°W

(This list is based on USGS data and may include former settlements.)

== Education ==
Washington Township residents are served by the Pierceton & Washington Township Public Library in Pierceton.
