= Harrison Township, Kosciusko County, Indiana =

Harrison Township
- Township
- Coordinates: 41°12′54″N 85°58′51″W
- Country: United States
- State: Indiana
- County: Kosciusko

Government
  - Type: Indiana township

Area
  - Total: 42.92 sq mi (111.2 km^{2})
  - Land: 41.7 sq mi (108 km^{2})
  - Water: 1.22 sq mi (3.2 km^{2})
- Elevation: 804 ft (245 m)

Population (2020)
  - Total: 3,786
  - Density: 86/sq mi (33/km^{2})
- Time zone: UTC-5 (Eastern (EST))
  - Summer (DST): UTC-4 (EDT)
- FIPS code: 18-31882
- GNIS feature ID: 453391

Historical population
Census	Pop.	Note	%±
1920	1,760		—
1930	1,785		1.4%
1940	1,921		7.6%
1950	2,031		5.7%
1960	2,232		9.9%
1970	2,523		13.0%
1980	3,226		27.9%
1990	3,377		4.7%
2000	3,437		1.8%
2010	3,587		4.4%
2020	3,786		5.5%
US Census:

Harrison Township is one of seventeen townships in Kosciusko County, Indiana. As of the 2020 census, its population was 3,786 (up from 3,587 at 2010) and it contained 1,569 housing units.

Harrison Township was organized in 1838.

== Geography ==
According to the 2010 census, the township has a total area of 42.92 square miles (111.2 km^{2}), of which 41.7 square miles (108 km^{2}) (or 97.16%) is land and 1.22 square miles (3.2 km^{2}) (or 2.84%) is water.

=== Cities and towns ===
- Mentone (north side)

=== Unincorporated towns ===
- Palestine at 41.1783775°N 85.9497161°W

(This list is based on USGS data and may include former settlements.)

== Education ==
Harrison Township residents may obtain a free library card from the Bell Memorial Public Library in Mentone.
