= Barbee, Indiana =

- Unincorporated community and Census designated place
- Location within Indiana Location within the United States
- Coordinates: 41°17′31″N 85°43′05″W
- Country: United States
- State: Indiana
- County: Kosciusko
- Township: Tippecanoe
- Elevation: 863 ft (263 m)
- Time zone: UTC-5 (Eastern (EST))
  - Summer (DST): UTC-4 (EDT)
- ZIP code: 46582
- FIPS code: 18-03358
- GNIS feature ID: 2830428

Barbee is an unincorporated community in Tippecanoe Township, Kosciusko County, in the U.S. state of Indiana.

== History ==
A post office was established at Barbee in 1898, and closed that same year. William Barbee was a pioneer settler in the area.

== Demographics ==
The United States Census Bureau delineated Barbee as a census designated place in the 2022 American Community Survey.
