= Burket, Indiana =

- Town
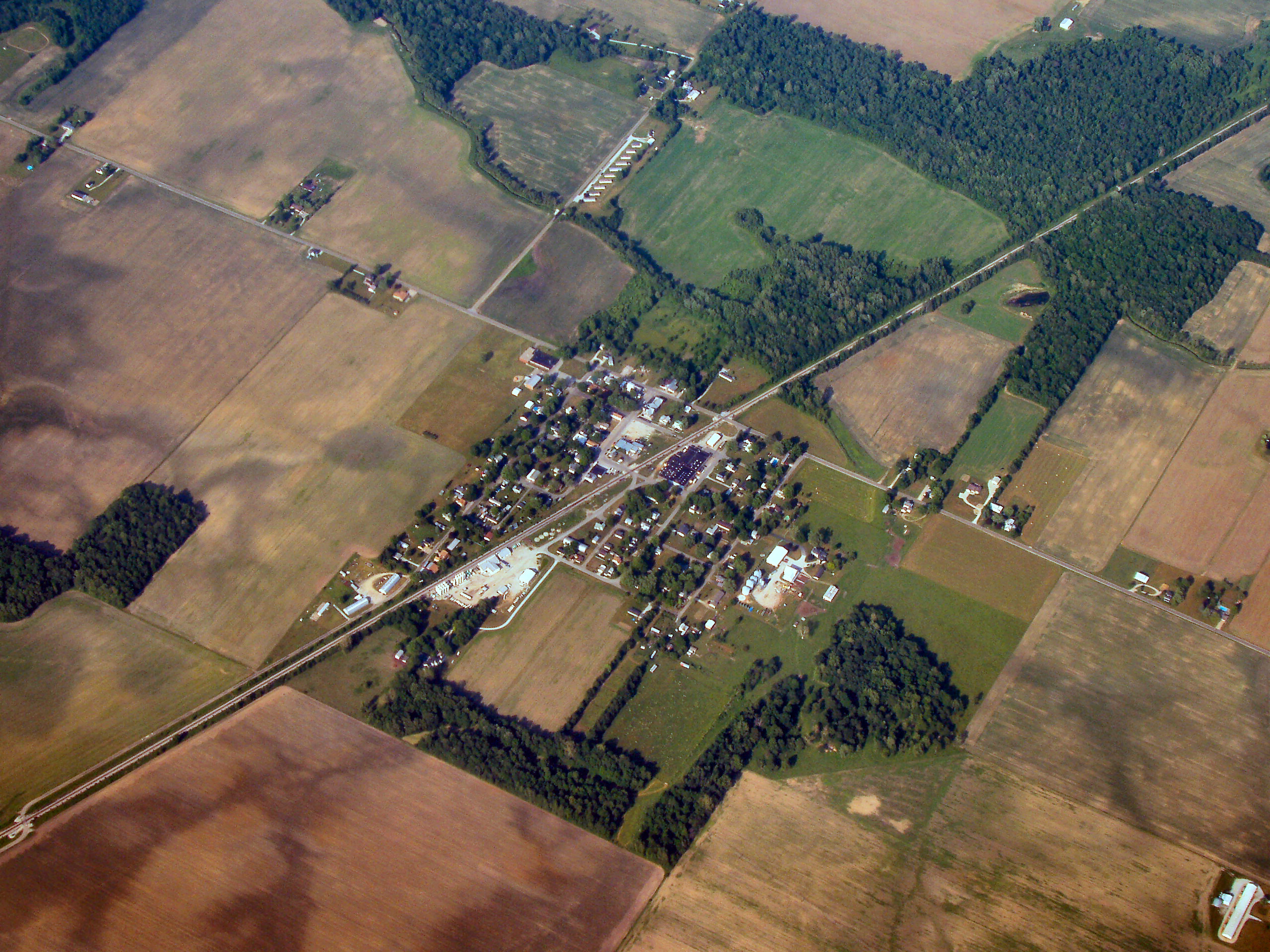
- Burket from the air

- Location of Burket in Kosciusko County, Indiana.
- Coordinates: 41°09′18″N 85°58′07″W
- Country: United States
- State: Indiana
- County: Kosciusko
- Township: Seward

Area
  - Total: 0.069 sq mi (0.18 km^{2})
  - Land: 0.069 sq mi (0.18 km^{2})
  - Water: 0 sq mi (0.00 km^{2})
- Elevation: 863 ft (263 m)

Population (2020)
  - Total: 123
  - Density: 1,724.5/sq mi (665.82/km^{2})
- Time zone: UTC-5 (Eastern (EST))
  - Summer (DST): UTC-5 (EST)
- ZIP code: 46508
- Area code: 574
- FIPS code: 18-09226
- GNIS feature ID: 2396618

Burket is a town in Seward Township, Kosciusko County, in the U.S. state of Indiana. The population was 123 at the 2020 census.

== History ==
Burket (originally spelled Burkett) was surveyed and platted by Elias Burkett in the spring of 1882. The Burket post office was established in 1882.

== Geography ==
According to the 2010 census, Burket has a total area of 0.07 square miles (0.18 km^{2}), all land.

== Demographics ==
Historical population
Census	Pop.	Note	%±
1940	216		—
1950	217		0.5%
1960	259		19.4%
1970	210		−18.9%
1980	260		23.8%
1990	200		−23.1%
2000	195		−2.5%
2010	195		0.0%
2020	123		−36.9%
U.S. Decennial Census

=== 2010 census ===
As of the census of 2010, there were 195 people, 68 households, and 45 families living in the town. The population density was 2,785.7 inhabitants per square mile (1,075.6/km^{2}). There were 74 housing units at an average density of 1,057.1 per square mile (408.1/km^{2}). The racial makeup of the town was 96.9% White, 2.6% Native American, and 0.5% from two or more races. Hispanic or Latino of any race were 3.6% of the population.

There were 68 households, of which 41.2% had children under the age of 18 living with them, 47.1% were married couples living together, 13.2% had a female householder with no husband present, 5.9% had a male householder with no wife present, and 33.8% were non-families. 29.4% of all households were made up of individuals, and 17.6% had someone living alone who was 65 years of age or older. The average household size was 2.87 and the average family size was 3.56.

The median age in the town was 34.3 years. 32.8% of residents were under the age of 18; 7.8% were between the ages of 18 and 24; 28.2% were from 25 to 44; 19.5% were from 45 to 64; and 11.8% were 65 years of age or older. The gender makeup of the town was 44.6% male and 55.4% female.

=== 2000 census ===
As of the census of 2000, there were 195 people, 76 households, and 55 families living in the town. The population density was 2,685.1 inhabitants per square mile (1,036.7/km^{2}). There were 78 housing units at an average density of 1,074.0 per square mile (414.7/km^{2}). The racial makeup of the town was 97.95% White, 1.54% from other races, and 0.51% from two or more races. Hispanic or Latino of any race were 1.54% of the population.

There were 76 households, out of which 31.6% had children under the age of 18 living with them, 53.9% were married couples living together, 13.2% had a female householder with no husband present, and 27.6% were non-families. 25.0% of all households were made up of individuals, and 11.8% had someone living alone who was 65 years of age or older. The average household size was 2.57 and the average family size was 3.11.

In the town, the population was spread out, with 26.7% under the age of 18, 10.3% from 18 to 24, 29.2% from 25 to 44, 21.5% from 45 to 64, and 12.3% who were 65 years of age or older. The median age was 33 years. For every 100 females, there were 105.3 males. For every 100 females age 18 and over, there were 93.2 males.

The median income for a household in the town was $27,500, and the median income for a family was $38,571. Males had a median income of $28,250 versus $19,583 for females. The per capita income for the town was $13,098. About 4.3% of families and 11.6% of the population were below the poverty line, including none of those under the age of eighteen and 26.7% of those 65 or over.
