= Waubee Lake =

- Location within Indiana Location within the United States

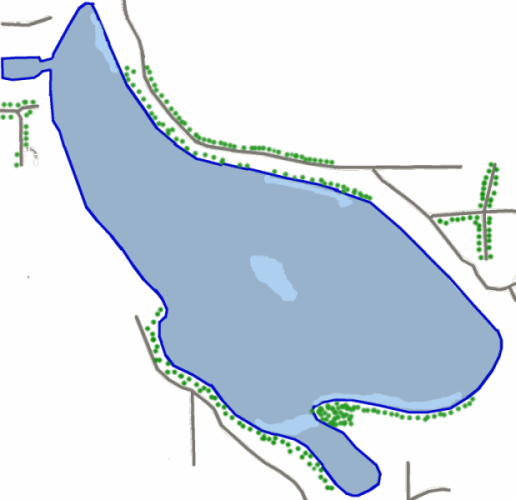
- map
- Location: Kosciusko County, Indiana
- Coordinates: 41°23′15″N 085°49′45″W
- Type: lake
- Basin countries: United States
- Surface elevation: 830 feet (250 m)

Waubee Lake (also incorrectly Wabee) is a small freshwater lake situated 2 miles (3 km) southeast of Milford, Kosciusko County, Indiana, United States.

Waubee is typical in structure of natural lakes of the glaciated portions of the upper Midwest. Like other lakes in the general area, Waubee is lined with vacation homes and year-round residences. Part of the extreme upper west shore is void of residences and borders farm land. A boat ramp can be found on the lake's upper east shore.

Waubee Lake is also home to Camp Alexander Mack, a Christian Camp, Conference, and Retreat Center operated by the Church of the Brethren.

The name Waubee is believed to have come from a common name, Wau-Be, of the Potawatomi people who had a camp where now stands but no authority exists for this claim.

The USGS/GNIS has Waubee Lake incorrectly spelled as Wabee Lake. A name change request has been submitted to the United States Geographical Survey and is unchanged as of April 2022.
