= Gravelton, Indiana =

- Unincorporated community
- Location within Indiana Location within the United States
- Coordinates: 41°26′09″N 85°55′27″W
- Country: United States
- State: Indiana
- County: Elkhart, Kosciusko
- Township: Union, Jefferson
- Elevation: 846 ft (258 m)
- Time zone: UTC-5 (Eastern (EST))
  - Summer (DST): UTC-4 (EDT)
- ZIP code: 46550
- FIPS code: 18-29052
- GNIS feature ID: 435362

Gravelton is an unincorporated community in Elkhart and Kosciusko counties, in the U.S. state of Indiana.

== History ==
Gravelton was platted in 1876. The name likely refers to the presence of a gravel pit. A post office was established at Gravelton in 1876, and remained in operation until it was discontinued in 1906.
