= Lake Wawasee =

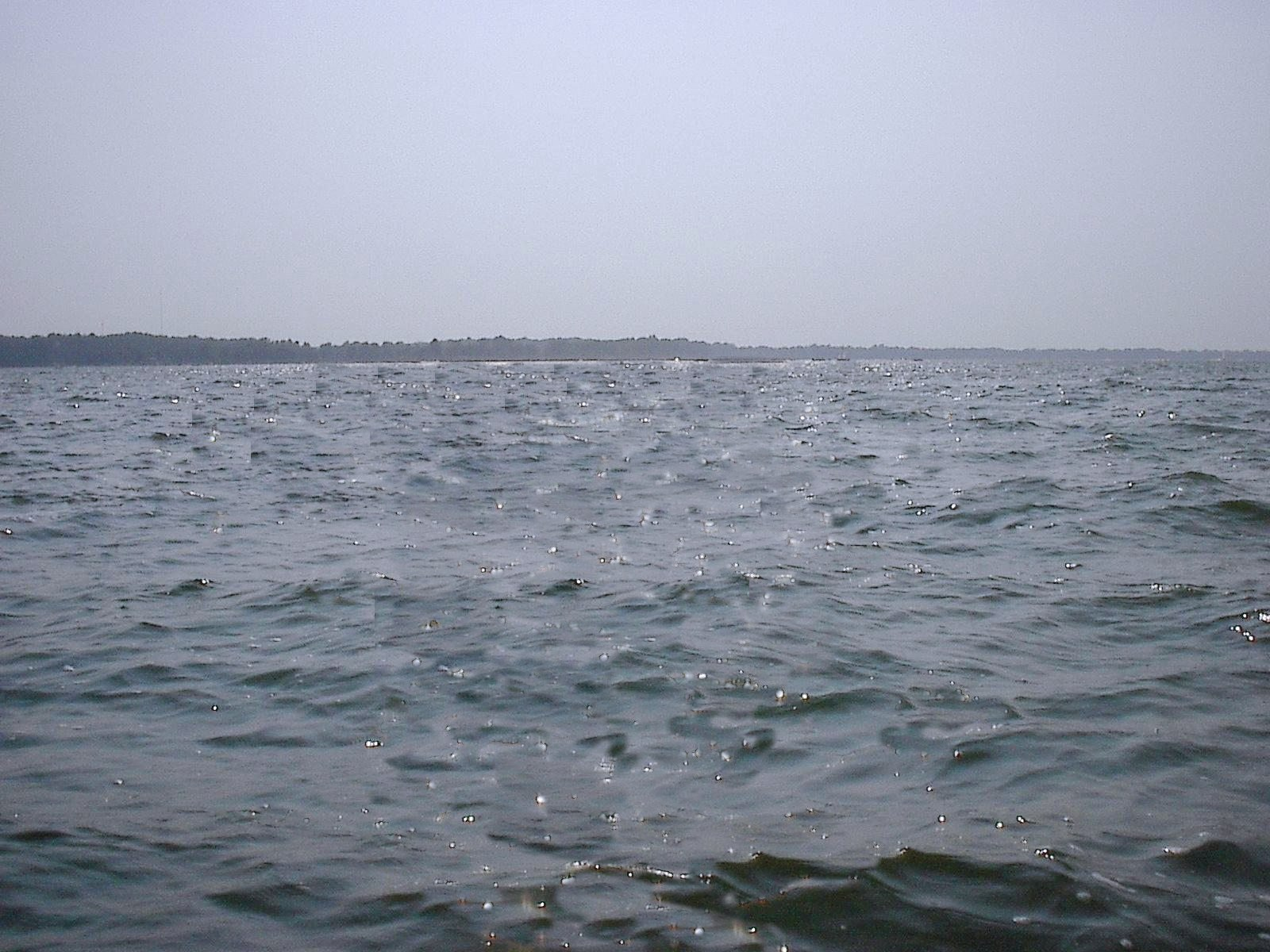

- Location within Indiana Location within the United States
- Location: Syracuse, Indiana, Kosciusko County, Indiana
- Coordinates: 41°24′N 85°42′W
- Lake type: Glacial lake
- Primary inflows: Spring, Lake Papakeechie
- Primary outflows: Lower Turkey Creek
- Catchment area: 23,618 acres (95.58 km^{2})
- Basin countries: United States
- Surface area: 3,000 acres (12 km^{2})
- Average depth: 22 ft (6.7 m)
- Max. depth: 77 ft (23 m)
- Residence time: 3.5 years
- Surface elevation: 856 ft (261 m)
- Islands: 2

Lake Wawasee, formerly Turkey Lake, is a natural lake southeast of Syracuse in Kosciusko County, Indiana, United States. It is the largest natural lake wholly contained within Indiana. It is located just east of Indiana State Road 13.

== History ==
Lake Wawasee has a long history extending from the Pleistocene epoch, arrival of early settlers, and its growth from the 19th century through today. The lake is named for Miami chief Wawasee (Wau-wuh-see), brother of Miami chief Papakeecha, which translated means "Flat Belly."

Lake Wawasee has a history of being a summer vacation area for residents from Indianapolis and Chicago. The Spink's Hotel (now condominiums) overlooking Lake Wawasee was a luxury hotel that hosted famous vacationers including Al Capone. Eli Lilly maintained residence on Lake Wawasee, and his home remains a landmark on the lake.

== Geographic places ==
Known geographic place names around Wawasee: Black's Point, Black Stump Point, Jones Landing, Willow Grove, Pickwick Park, Kale Island, Oakwood, Lakeview-South Park, Ogden's Island, Sand Point, Johnson's Bay, Buttermilk Bay, Vawter Park, Ideal Beach, Waveland Beach, Conkling Hill, Morrison's Island, and Natti Crow Beach.

=== Black Stump Point ===
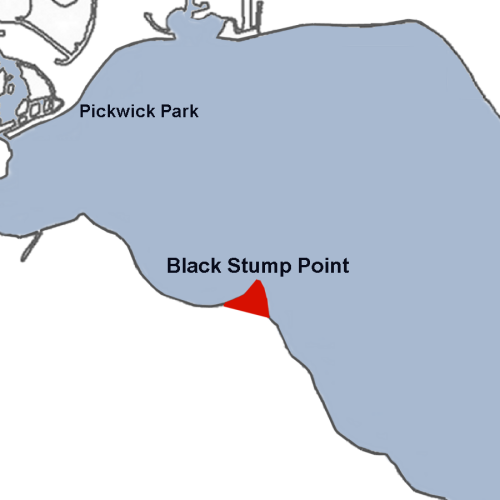
Black Stump Point in red.

Located at the northwest end of Lake Wawasee, Black Stump Point protrudes northeasterly out into the lake. Roads on this geographic point are E. Waco Drive and N. Waco Point Drive. Businesses located during the 1950s and 1960s were Mocks' Marina and Waco, a boat-in and drive-in restaurant.

=== Cedar Beach/Wawasee ===
Cedar Beach was established as an unincorporated community in the area, with a post office established under this name in 1879. It was renamed Wawasee in 1893, and the post office remained in operation until it was discontinued in 1938. The population was 100 in 1940.

=== Crow's Bay ===
Crow's Bay is located on Wawasee's eastern shore and between Cedar Point to the north and Morrison's Island to the south. Crows Bay is named after Nathaniel Crow who established the Crow's Nest. Natti Crow Beach is a prominent area on the bay's southern end.

=== Jarrett's Bay ===
Also known in recent years as Buttermilk Bay, Jarrett's Bay is the extreme southern end of Wawasee. Jarrett's Bay extends southeast with Morrison's Island to the east and Clark's Point to the west. This bay was named after Lewis Jarrett who owned a resort known as Buttermilk Point.

Also see: Lake Wawasee history: Buttermilk Point

=== Johnson's Bay ===
Johnson's Bay is located on Wawasee's east side. Ogden Island and Cedar Point serve as the two prominent points of land creating this bay. Johnson's Bay is, for the most part, barren of lakeside homes as its northern, northeastern, and northwestern sections are cat tailed marsh. Due to its location it became a haven for water skiing at least as far back as the 1950s. Cedar Point affords a break from north winds and lacks the heavy boat traffic found on much of the lake.

=== Morrison Island ===
Morrison Island, originally Eagle Island, is named after William T. Morrison who lived on this island until 1890. Today, the island has a number of homes lining the lakeside (north, south, west) and boat houses lining the eastern side with channel access to Wawasee. The island has seawalls with the ground just a couple of feet from the lake's level. Morrison Island is one of the lowest elevation residential areas on Lake Wawasee. A 1,000 by 100 feet (305 by 30 m) public grass green space lined with trees occupies the center of the island. Access by car via E. Morrison Island Road.

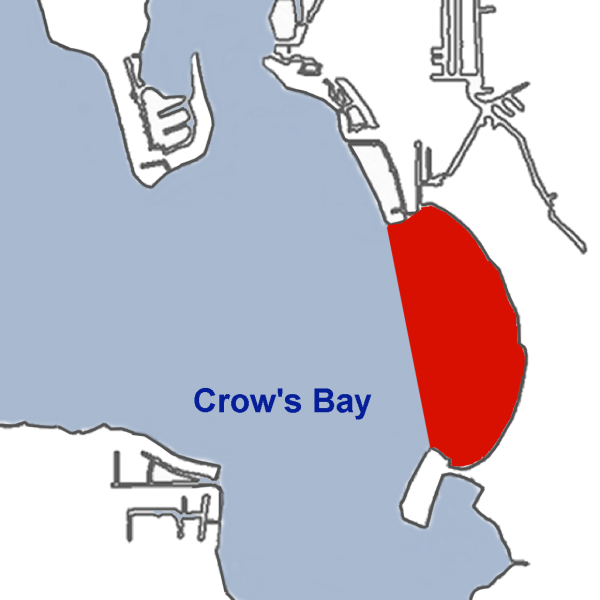
Crow's Bay in red

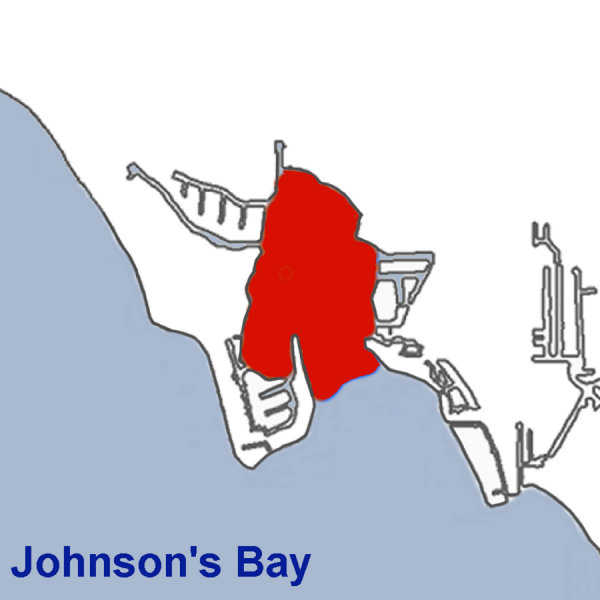
Johnson's Bay in red

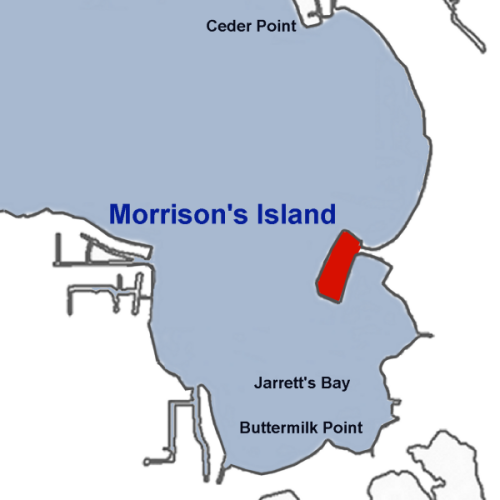
Morrison's Island in red

=== Main channel ===
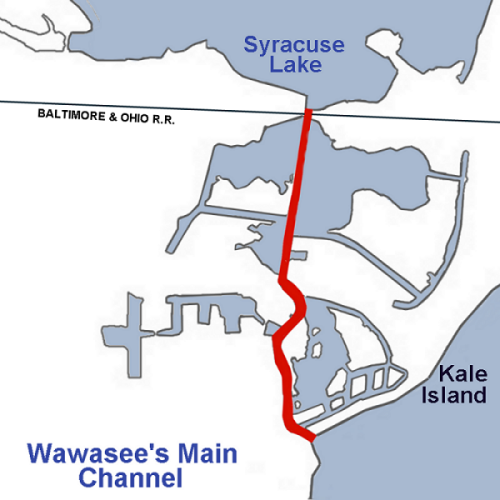
Location of the Main Channel

The main channel is not officially part of Lake Wawasee but does perform as an outlet for water heading north. The main channel begins at the lake's northwest shore with Oakwood Park on its west and Kale Island on its east and flows north through Mudd Lake and finally into Syracuse Lake. The main channel is lined with homes and a marina on its west for its first third of travel. On the channel's east side is a large wetland marsh where a gristmill once stood.

== Recreation ==
=== Marinas ===
- Griffith's Wawasee Marina was founded in 1946 and is located on Wawasee's southeast end overlooking Buttermilk Bay and tucked behind Morrison Island to the marina's west.
- Main Channel Marina was established in 1976 and is located on the west side of the Main Channel on the northwest side of Wawasee.
- Johnson's Bay Marina is no longer in service (condos)and used to be located in a channel on the east side of Johnson's Bay.
- Wawasee Boat Company was founded in 1929 and is located on Wawasee's north shore off of E. Cornelius Road.

=== Wawasee Yacht Club ===
The Wawasee Yacht Club (est. 1935) is located on the northeast shore. During the summer season, the club is home to four competitive one-design fleets: 28-foot E-Scow, 19-foot Lightning (dinghy), 20-foot I-20 Scow, and 13-foot Sunfish (sailboat) class boats.

Their mission is to foster, promote and encourage the sport of sailboat racing, and to promote the science of seamanship.

=== Annual Fireworks ===
Independence Day fireworks - The 4th of July weekend on Saturday sports a fireworks display launched from three waterborne platforms and synchronized with music played by a local radio station. There is also a 'Flotilla' which features decorated boats in a parade around the lake.

=== Wawascene.com ===
Wawascene.com is an online magazine dedicated to life at Lake Wawasee & Syracuse Lake. Formed in 2009, this website hosts a live webcam controllable by users, water temperature, photos, blogs, news, video, a local business directory and resident directory.

== Bathymetry ==
Wawasee's bottom consists of channels and rises. It was noted in 1895 that if the water level in Wawasee were dropped 30 feet (9.1 m), 4 distinct bodies of water would then be visibly connected by channels 100 to 200 feet (61 m) wide and 8–10 feet deep.

- The first body would be in front of Crow's Nest (Crow Bay) with a depth of 19 feet (5.8 m).
- The second body would be 50% of Jarrett's Bay with maximum depth of 38 feet (12 m).
- The third would be the main body of Wawasee with a decreased width of 50% and maximum depth of 38 feet (12 m).
- The fourth would be a small just northwest of Black Stump Point with a maximum depth of 40 feet (12 m).

If Wawasee lost 40 feet (12 m) of water there would be 4 distinct lakes without channels connecting them.

== Hydrology ==
=== Classification ===
Lake Wawasee measures 12 km^{2} (3,000 acres) in size and is classified as a Trophic Class 1 lake with two major basins. The north basin has a eutrophication index value of 10 and the south basin has a eutrophication index of 12. The maximum depth is 22 m (72 ft) and an average depth of 6.7 m (22 ft). The lake is presently healthy and has a balanced aquatic ecosystem.

=== Water sources ===
Lake Wawasee is a spring fed lake with exposed springs flowing into Wawasee from south, west, and east sides. Lake Papakeechie, sitting a few feet higher in elevation, provides a vast amount of water from a spillway at Buttermilk Bay at Wawasee's south end. Wawasee's structure is typical of natural lakes in the formerly glaciated portions of the Midwest. It is supplied by a watershed of 23,618 acres (95.58 km^{2}) which starts at Little Knapp Lake and Harper Lake in Noble County and flows down through 10 lakes by way of Turkey Creek into Lake Wawasee. Water exits into through the wetlands of Main Channel and Mudd Lake into Syracuse Lake. The Wawasee Watershed is an area of that encompasses Wawasee, Syracuse, Bonar Lake and Papakeechie lakes as well as the ten lakes in the upper Turkey Creek and Papakeechie subwatersheds.

There are two smaller lakes near Wawasee. Syracuse Lake to the north is accessible from Wawasee through the 'Main Channel.' Lake Papakeechie to the south is at an elevation slightly higher than Wawasee. It is not accessible by boat from Wawasee.

== Water quality and wetlands ==
The community around Wawasee pushes for water clarity and keeping the lake clean for future generations. One of the most active organizations involved in wetland and water quality protection is the Wawasee Area Conservancy Foundation (WACF). This non profit group has a documented history of action and lake preservation. The WACF was formed in 1991 to anticipate, discover, and correct threats to the Wawasee Area Watershed and to its water quality. The WACF is dedicated to the preservation and enhancement of the area and works hand-in-hand with property owner groups, the State Department of Natural Resources and other governmental and civic organizations that share its concerns.

One ongoing battle concerning preservation involves a local farmer who has a permit to open a hog farm in the area. So far the conservancy has been successful in dissuading the local farmer. Lake Wawasee is unusually clear for a Midwest lake. This is, in part, due to its location just a few miles from a continental divide that separates water that runs off to the Mississippi River basin and Lake Michigan. Another reason for this clarity is that most of the lake's nutrients are tied up in vegetation and zebra mussels. According to a 1995 study, Wawasee's water clarity allows for viewing up to 15-foot (4.6 m) depths, whereas other Midwest lakes, on average, have clarity allowing for viewing 2-to-6-foot (0.61 to 1.83 m) depths.

Since 1991, invasive zebra mussels have been found in Lake Wawasee and have become a nuisance to the local marinas, fishermen, and property owners.
