= Syracuse, Indiana =

- Town
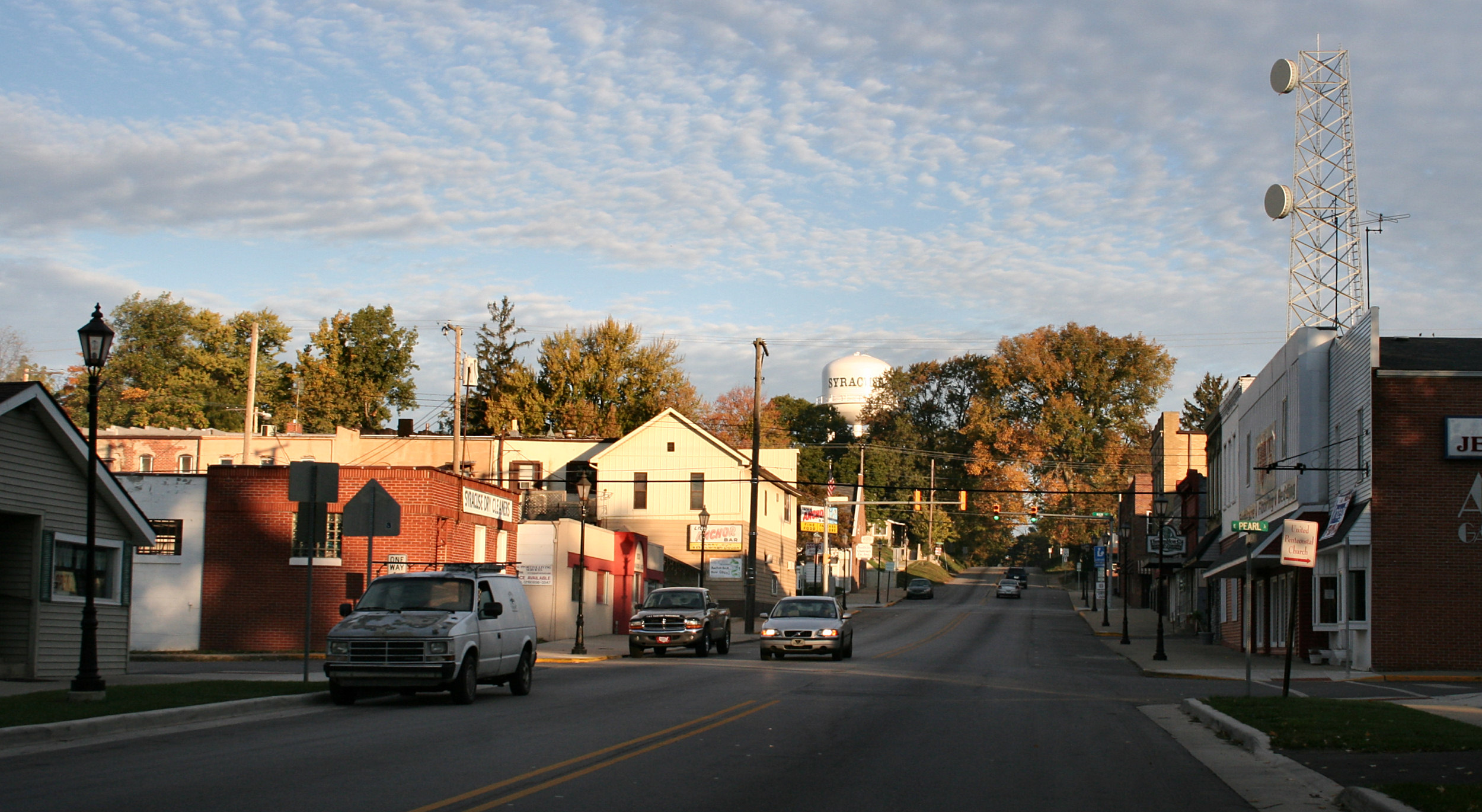
- Downtown, looking north.

- Logo

- Location of Syracuse in Kosciusko County, Indiana.
- Coordinates: 41°25′27″N 85°45′10″W
- Country: United States
- State: Indiana
- County: Kosciusko
- Township: Turkey Creek

Area
  - Total: 2.34 sq mi (6.06 km^{2})
  - Land: 1.97 sq mi (5.10 km^{2})
  - Water: 0.37 sq mi (0.95 km^{2})
- Elevation: 860 ft (260 m)

Population (2020)
  - Total: 3,079
  - Density: 1,562.2/sq mi (603.17/km^{2})
- Time zone: UTC-5 (Eastern (EST))
  - Summer (DST): UTC-4 (EDT)
- ZIP code: 46567
- Area code: 574
- FIPS code: 18-74744
- GNIS feature ID: 2397693
- Website: www.syracusein.org

Syracuse is a town in Turkey Creek Township, Kosciusko County, in the U.S. state of Indiana. The population was 3,079 at the 2020 census. Syracuse is the location of Lake Syracuse and the nearby, larger Lake Wawasee, in addition to several other lakes in the region. The National Weather Service operates a Weather Forecast Office South of town, toward North Webster. It serves Northern Indiana, Northwestern Ohio and Southwestern Michigan.

== History ==
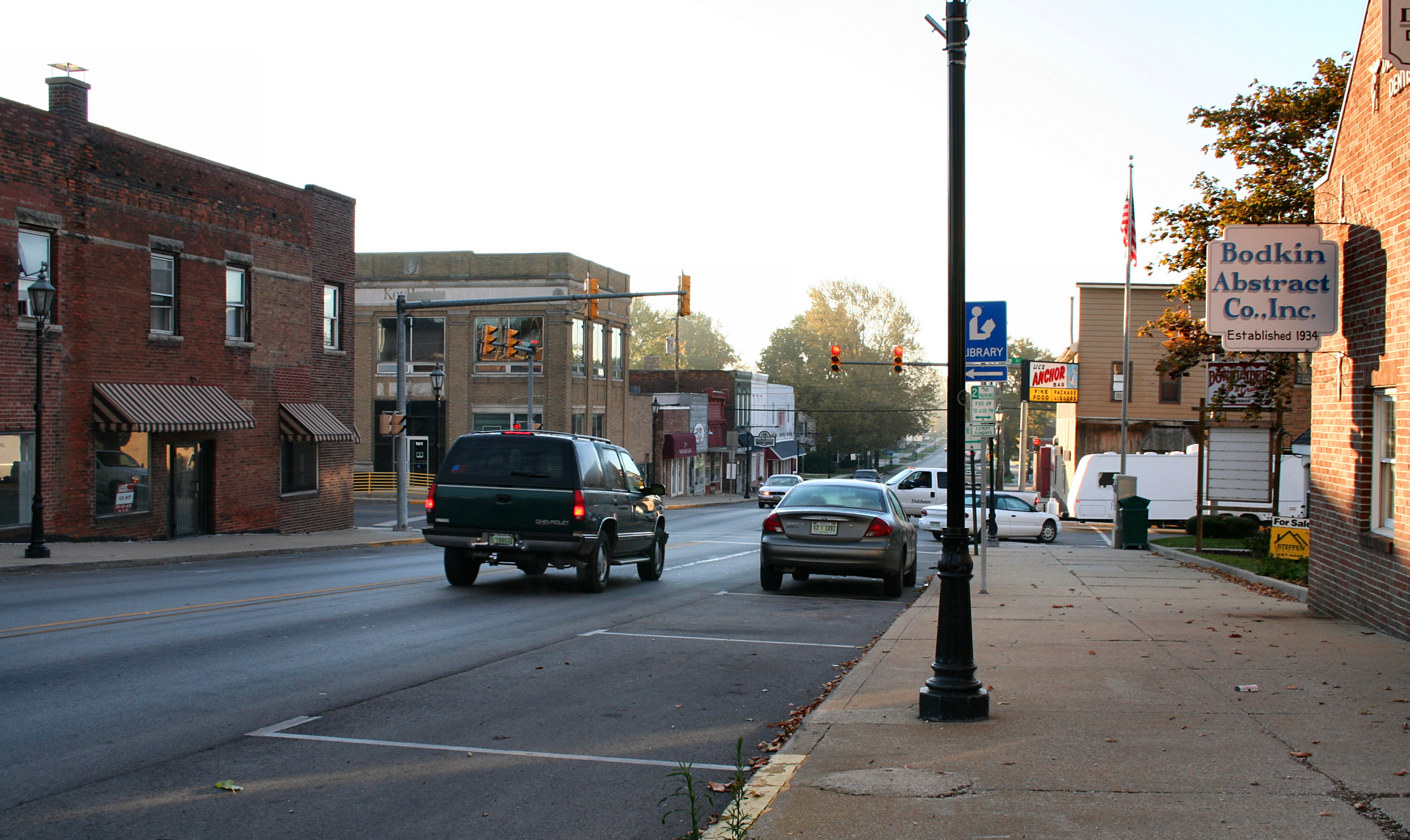
Downtown, looking south.

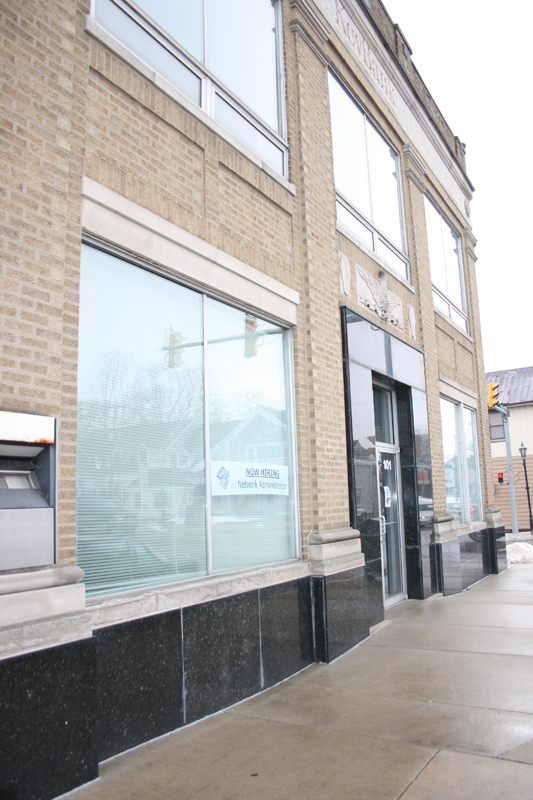
Downtown, looking West. Bank of Syracuse - Currently an office building Wawasee Plaza

Old State Syracuse was laid out in 1837. It was likely named after the city of Syracuse, New York. The Syracuse post office was established in 1837.

== Geography ==
According to the 2010 census, Syracuse has a total area of 2.156 square miles (5.58 km^{2}), of which 1.79 square miles (4.64 km^{2}) (or 83.02%) is land and 0.366 square miles (0.95 km^{2}) (or 16.98%) is water.

== Education ==
Syracuse is the headquarters of the Wawasee School Corporation teaching students in K-12. It is the location of Administration, Wawasee High School, Syracuse Elementary, and Wawasee Middle School. Other schools in the corporation are located in the towns of Milford and North Webster.

The town has a lending library, the Syracuse-Turkey Creek Township Public Library.

== Demographics ==
Historical population
Census	Pop.	Note	%±
1860	182		—
1870	227		24.7%
1880	491		116.3%
1890	518		5.5%
1900	928		79.2%
1910	1,379		48.6%
1920	1,171		−15.1%
1930	1,190		1.6%
1940	1,346		13.1%
1950	1,453		7.9%
1960	1,595		9.8%
1970	1,546		−3.1%
1980	2,579		66.8%
1990	2,729		5.8%
2000	3,038		11.3%
2010	2,810		−7.5%
2020	3,079		9.6%
U.S. Decennial Census

=== 2020 census ===
As of the 2020 census, Syracuse had a population of 3,079. The median age was 39.8 years. 22.9% of residents were under the age of 18 and 17.4% of residents were 65 years of age or older. For every 100 females there were 99.5 males, and for every 100 females age 18 and over there were 95.6 males age 18 and over.

100.0% of residents lived in urban areas, while 0.0% lived in rural areas.

There were 1,306 households in Syracuse, of which 27.6% had children under the age of 18 living in them. Of all households, 38.4% were married-couple households, 23.5% were households with a male householder and no spouse or partner present, and 27.4% were households with a female householder and no spouse or partner present. About 33.0% of all households were made up of individuals and 12.0% had someone living alone who was 65 years of age or older.

There were 1,653 housing units, of which 21.0% were vacant. The homeowner vacancy rate was 4.9% and the rental vacancy rate was 12.2%.

Racial composition as of the 2020 census
Race	Number	Percent
White	2,782	90.4%
Black or African American	21	0.7%
American Indian and Alaska Native	5	0.2%
Asian	29	0.9%
Native Hawaiian and Other Pacific Islander	3	0.1%
Some other race	64	2.1%
Two or more races	175	5.7%
Hispanic or Latino (of any race)	224	7.3%

=== 2010 census ===
At the 2010 census, there were 2,810 people, 1,158 households and 729 families living in the town. The population density was 1,569.8 inhabitants per square mile (606.1/km^{2}). There were 1,492 housing units at an average density of 833.5 per square mile (321.8/km^{2}). The racial makeup of the town was 95.7% White, 0.6% African American, 0.1% Native American, 0.7% Asian, 1.6% from other races, and 1.3% from two or more races. Hispanic or Latino of any race were 5.2% of the population.

There were 1,158 households, of which 31.8% had children under the age of 18 living with them, 42.6% were married couples living together, 13.2% had a female householder with no husband present, 7.2% had a male householder with no wife present, and 37.0% were non-families. 30.1% of all households were made up of individuals, and 11.1% had someone living alone who was 65 years of age or older. The average household size was 2.43 and the average family size was 2.98.

The median age in the town was 37.4 years. 25.1% of residents were under the age of 18; 8.1% were between the ages of 18 and 24; 26.4% were from 25 to 44; 27.2% were from 45 to 64; and 13.1% were 65 years of age or older. The gender makeup of the town was 50.4% male and 49.6% female.

=== 2000 census ===
At the 2000 census, there were 3,038 people, 1,236 households and 779 families living in the town. The population density was 1,888.5 inhabitants per square mile (729.2/km^{2}). There were 1,380 housing units at an average density of 857.8 per square mile (331.2/km^{2}). The racial makeup of the town was 93.75% White, 0.86% African American, 0.36% Native American, 0.56% Asian, 0.03% Pacific Islander, 2.67% from other races, and 1.78% from two or more races. Hispanic or Latino of any race were 4.64% of the population.

There were 1,236 households, of which 31.4% had children under the age of 18, 46.1% were married couples living together, 11.6% had a female householder with no husband present, and 36.9% were non-families. Of all households, 30.1% were made up of individuals, and 11.4% had someone living alone who was 65 years of age or older. The average household size was 2.41 and the average family size was 2.98.

26.4% of the population were under the age of 18, 9.5% from 18 to 24, 27.9% from 25 to 44, 22.0% from 45 to 64, and 14.3% who were 65 years of age or older. The median age was 35 years. For every 100 females, there were 95.2 males. For every 100 females age 18 and over, there were 90.5 males.

The median household income was $40,000 and the median family income was $45,968. Males had a median income of $34,526 compared with $22,820 for females. The per capita income for the town was $18,822. About 3.2% of families and 5.7% of the population were below the poverty line, including 6.9% of those under age 18 and 4.1% of those age 65 or over.
