= Kosciusko County, Indiana =

County in Indiana, United States

- County
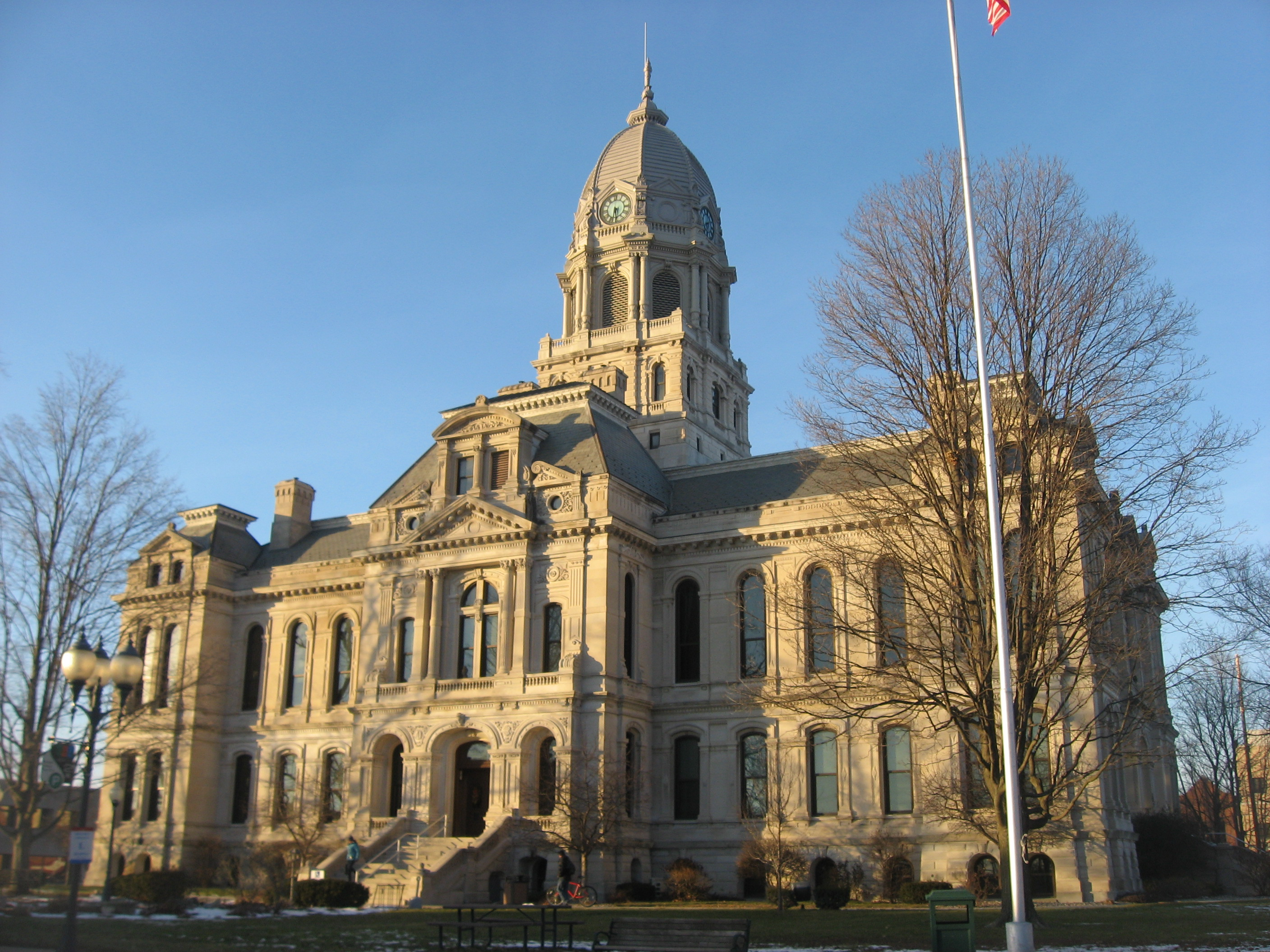
- Kosciusko County Courthouse in Warsaw

- Location within the U.S. state of Indiana
- Coordinates: 41°14′N 85°52′W
- Country: United States
- State: Indiana
- Founded: February 7, 1835 (authorized); 1836 (organized)
- Named for: Tadeusz Kościuszko
- Seat: Warsaw
- Largest city: Warsaw

Area
  - Total: 554.39 sq mi (1,435.9 km^{2})
  - Land: 531.38 sq mi (1,376.3 km^{2})
  - Water: 23.01 sq mi (59.6 km^{2}) 4.15%

Population (2020)
  - Total: 80,240
  - Estimate (2025): 80,892 ▲
  - Density: 152/sq mi (59/km^{2})
- Time zone: UTC−5 (Eastern)
  - Summer (DST): UTC−4 (EDT)
- Congressional districts: 2nd, 3rd
- Website: www.kosciusko.in.gov
- Indiana county number 43

Kosciusko County (/ˌkɒziˈɒskoʊ/ KOZ-ee-OSS-koh) is a county in the U.S. state of Indiana. At the 2020 United States census, its population was 80,240. The county seat (and only incorporated city) is Warsaw. The county was organized in 1836. It was named after the Polish general Tadeusz Kościuszko who served in the American Revolutionary War and then returned to Poland. The county seat is named after Warsaw, the capital of Poland.

== History ==
The Indiana State Legislature passed an omnibus county bill on February 7, 1835, that authorized the creation of thirteen counties in northeast Indiana, including Kosciusko. The county government was organized beginning in 1836. The county's boundary lines have remained unchanged since 1835.

== Geographical features ==
Kosciusko County terrain consists of low rolling hills dotted with bodies of water and drainages, with all available area devoted to agriculture or urban development. Its highest point (1025'/312 meters ASL) is a hill NE of Dewart Lake. The Tippecanoe River flows westward through the central part of the county, while the Eel River flows southwestward through the county's SE corner.

According to the 2010 census, the county has a total area of 554.39 square miles (1,435.9 km^{2}), of which 531.38 square miles (1,376.3 km^{2}) (or 95.85%) is land and 23.01 square miles (59.6 km^{2}) (or 4.15%) is water.

=== Adjacent counties ===
- Elkhart County - north
- Noble County - northeast
- Whitley County - southeast
- Wabash County - south
- Fulton County - southwest
- Marshall County - west

=== Major highways ===
- U.S. Route 30
- Indiana State Road 10
- Indiana State Road 13
- Indiana State Road 14
- Indiana State Road 15
- Indiana State Road 19
- Indiana State Road 25

=== Lakes ===
- Banning Lake
- Beaver Dam Lake
- Big Barbee Lake
- Big Chapman Lake
- Carr Lake
- Center Lake
- Dewart Lake
- Diamond Lake
- Fish Lake
- Goose Lake
- Hoffman Lake
- Hill Lake
- Irish Lake
- James Lake
- Kuhn Lake
- Lake Wawasee
- Little Barbee Lake
- Little Chapman Lake
- Loon Lake
- McClures Lake
- Muskellunge Lake
- Palestine Lake
- Papakeechie Lake
- Pike Lake
- Ridinger Lake
- Rock Lake (part)
- Sechrist Lake
- Shoe Lake
- Silver Lake
- Stanton Lake
- Syracuse Lake
- Tippecanoe Lake
- Waubee Lake
- Winona Lake
- Yellow Creek Lake

=== Protected areas ===
- Center Lake Wetland Conservation Area
- Edmund and Virginia Ball Nature Preserve
- Pisgah Marsh Nongame Area (part)

=== City and towns ===
- Burket
- Claypool
- Etna Green
- Leesburg
- Mentone
- Milford
- North Webster
- Pierceton
- Sidney
- Silver Lake
- Syracuse
- Warsaw (city)
- Winona Lake

=== Unincorporated communities ===
- Atwood
- Barbee
- Beaver Dam
- Bell Rohr Park
- Buttermilk Point
- Cedar Point
- Clunette
- DeFries Landing
- Gravelton
- Hastings
- Kinsey
- Lakeview Spring
- Monoquet
- Oswego
- Packerton
- Palestine
- Sevastopol
- South Park
- Wawasee
- Wawasee Village
- Wooster
- Yellowbanks

== Townships ==
- Clay
- Etna
- Franklin
- Harrison
- Jackson
- Jefferson
- Lake
- Monroe
- Plain
- Prairie
- Scott
- Seward
- Tippecanoe
- Turkey Creek
- Van Buren
- Washington
- Wayne

== Climate and weather ==
Warsaw, Indiana

Climate chart (precipitation, max. and min. temperature)
J	F	M	A	M	J	J	A	S	O	N	D
1.9 31 15	1.5 35 18	2.1 47 28	3.4 59 38	3.8 71 49	4.5 79 58	3.7 82 62	4.1 80 60	3.2 73 53	3 62 42	3 48 32	2.6 35 21
- █ Average max. and min. temperatures in °F
- █ Precipitation totals in inches
- Source: The Weather Channel
Metric conversion
J	F	M	A	M	J	J	A	S	O	N	D
47 −1 −9	37 2 −8	53 8 −2	85 15 3	97 22 9	115 26 14	93 28 17	103 27 16	82 23 12	77 17 6	75 9 0	67 2 −6
- █ Average max. and min. temperatures in °C
- █ Precipitation totals in mm

In recent years, average temperatures in Warsaw have ranged from a low of 15 °F (−9 °C) in January to a high of 82 °F (28 °C) in July, although a record low of −25 °F (−32 °C) was recorded in January 1985 and a record high of 103 °F (39 °C) was recorded in July 1976. Average monthly precipitation ranged from 1.45 inches (37 mm) in February to 4.51 inches (115 mm) in June.

== Demographics ==
Historical population
Census	Pop.	Note	%±
1840	4,170		—
1850	10,243		145.6%
1860	17,418		70.0%
1870	23,531		35.1%
1880	26,494		12.6%
1890	28,645		8.1%
1900	29,109		1.6%
1910	27,936		−4.0%
1920	27,120		−2.9%
1930	27,488		1.4%
1940	29,561		7.5%
1950	33,002		11.6%
1960	40,373		22.3%
1970	48,127		19.2%
1980	59,555		23.7%
1990	65,294		9.6%
2000	74,057		13.4%
2010	77,358		4.5%
2020	80,240		3.7%
2025 (est.)	80,892	▲	0.8%
US Decennial Census; 1790-1960 1900-90; 1990-2000 2010 2020 2025

=== Racial and ethnic composition ===
Kosciusko County, Indiana – Racial and ethnic composition Note: the US Census treats Hispanic/Latino as an ethnic category. This table excludes Latinos from the racial categories and assigns them to a separate category. Hispanics/Latinos may be of any race.
Race / Ethnicity (NH = Non-Hispanic)	Pop 1980	Pop 1990	Pop 2000	Pop 2010	Pop 2020	% 1980	% 1990	% 2000	% 2010	% 2020
White alone (NH)	58,073	63,295	68,816	69,531	67,990	97.51%	96.94%	92.92%	89.88%	84.73%
Black or African American alone (NH)	212	298	428	542	682	0.36%	0.46%	0.58%	0.70%	0.85%
Native American or Alaska Native alone (NH)	55	112	143	178	160	0.09%	0.17%	0.19%	0.23%	0.20%
Asian alone (NH)	198	311	408	642	1,336	0.33%	0.48%	0.55%	0.83%	1.67%
Native Hawaiian or Pacific Islander alone (NH)	x	x	6	19	16	x	x	0.01%	0.02%	0.02%
Other race alone (NH)	56	20	28	72	205	0.09%	0.03%	0.04%	0.09%	0.26%
Mixed race or Multiracial (NH)	x	x	506	740	2,359	x	x	0.68%	0.96%	2.94%
Hispanic or Latino (any race)	961	1,258	3,722	5,634	7,492	1.61%	1.93%	5.03%	7.28%	9.34%
Total	59,555	65,294	74,057	77,358	80,240	100.00%	100.00%	100.00%	100.00%	100.00%

=== 2020 census ===
As of the 2020 census, the county had a population of 80,240. The median age was 39.0 years. 23.6% of residents were under the age of 18 and 17.5% of residents were 65 years of age or older. For every 100 females there were 99.0 males, and for every 100 females age 18 and over there were 97.5 males age 18 and over.

The racial makeup of the county was 86.7% White, 0.9% Black or African American, 0.3% American Indian and Alaska Native, 1.7% Asian, <0.1% Native Hawaiian and Pacific Islander, 4.7% from some other race, and 5.7% from two or more races. Hispanic or Latino residents of any race comprised 9.3% of the population.

51.6% of residents lived in urban areas, while 48.4% lived in rural areas.

There were 31,196 households in the county, of which 30.1% had children under the age of 18 living in them. Of all households, 53.0% were married-couple households, 18.3% were households with a male householder and no spouse or partner present, and 22.1% were households with a female householder and no spouse or partner present. About 26.1% of all households were made up of individuals and 11.0% had someone living alone who was 65 years of age or older.

There were 38,133 housing units, of which 18.2% were vacant. Among occupied housing units, 76.1% were owner-occupied and 23.9% were renter-occupied. The homeowner vacancy rate was 1.4% and the rental vacancy rate was 10.0%.

=== 2010 census ===
As of the 2010 United States census, there were 77,358 people, 29,197 households, and 20,740 families in the county. The population density was 145.6 inhabitants per square mile (56.2/km^{2}). There were 37,038 housing units at an average density of 69.7 per square mile (26.9/km^{2}). The racial makeup of the county was 93.3% white, 0.8% Asian, 0.7% black or African American, 0.3% Native American, 3.4% from other races, and 1.4% from two or more races. Those of Hispanic or Latino origin made up 7.3% of the population. In terms of ancestry, 33.5% were German, 11.5% were Irish, 10.8% were English, and 8.2% were American.

Of the 29,197 households, 33.9% had children under the age of 18 living with them, 56.6% were married couples living together, 9.5% had a female householder with no husband present, 29.0% were non-families, and 23.9% of all households were made up of individuals. The average household size was 2.60 and the average family size was 3.07. The median age was 37.7 years.

The median income for a household in the county was $47,697 and the median income for a family was $56,305. Males had a median income of $44,358 versus $29,320 for females. The per capita income for the county was $24,019. About 7.0% of families and 10.0% of the population were below the poverty line, including 13.5% of those under age 18 and 5.2% of those age 65 or over.

== Community ==
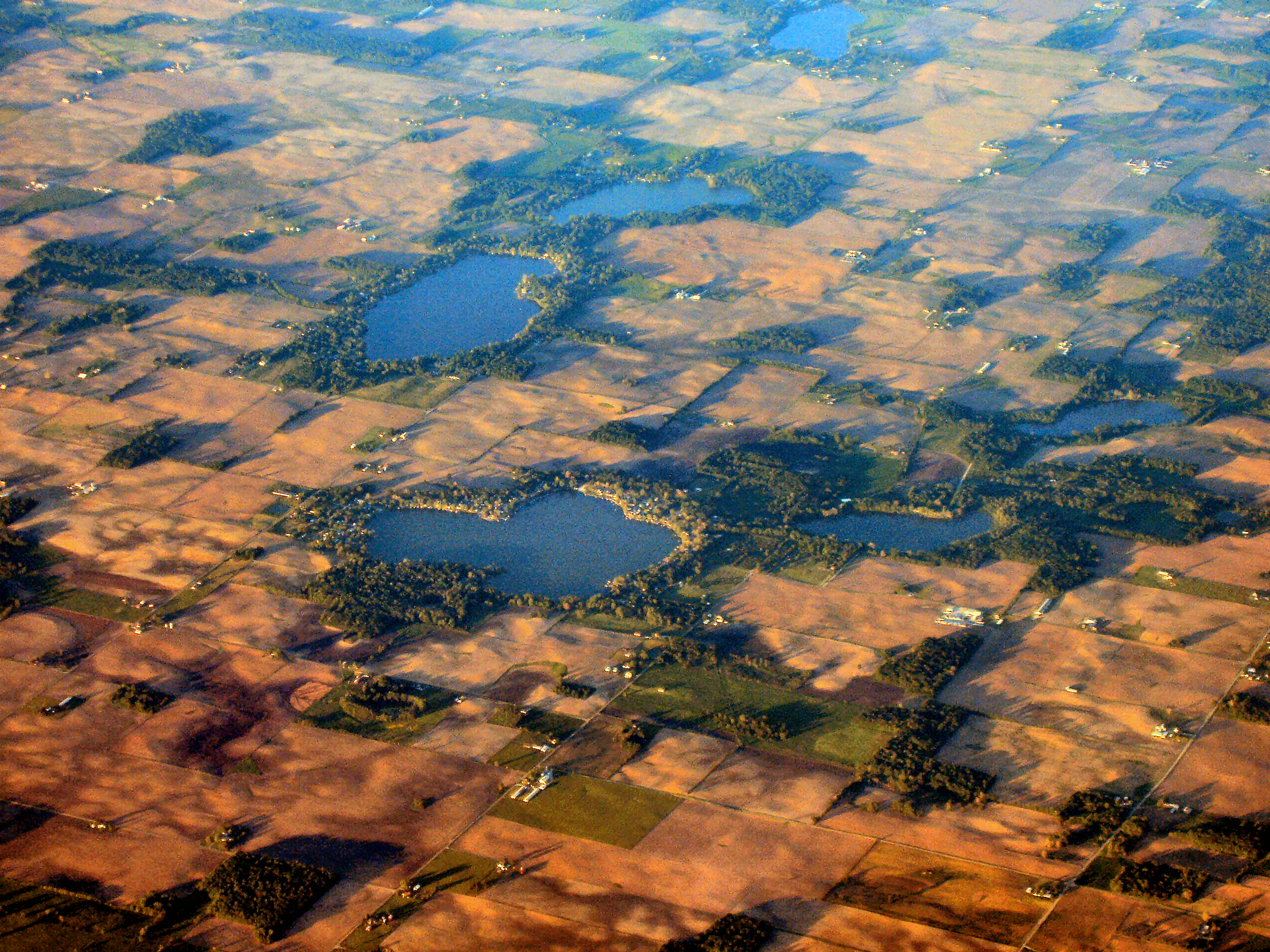
Southern Kosciusko County is dotted with small lakes like Beaver Dam Lake (foreground) near Silver Lake.

=== Newspapers ===
- Times-Union
- The Mail-Journal
- The PAPER
- Ink Free News

=== Radio Stations ===
- WRSW-AM 1480/99.7 FM (News Now Warsaw)
- WRSW-FM (Classic Hits 107.3 WRSW
- WAWC-FM (Willie 103.5)

== Government ==
The county government is a constitutional body, and is granted specific powers by the Constitution of Indiana, and by the Indiana Code.

County Council: The legislative branch of the county government; controls spending and revenue collection in the county. Representatives, elected to four-year terms from county districts, are responsible for setting salaries, the annual budget, and special spending. The council has limited authority to impose local taxes, in the form of an income and property tax that is subject to state level approval, excise taxes, and service taxes.

Board of Commissioners: The executive body of the county; commissioners are elected countywide to staggered four-year terms. One commissioner serves as president. The commissioners execute the acts legislated by the council, collect revenue, and manage the county government.

Court: The county maintains a small claims court that handles civil cases. The county also maintains a Circuit and Superior Court. The judge on each court is elected to a term of six years and must be a member of the Indiana bar.

County Officials: The county has other elected offices, including sheriff, coroner, auditor, treasurer, recorder, surveyor, and circuit court clerk. The officials are elected countywide to four-year terms. Members elected to county government positions are required to declare party affiliations and to be residents of the county.

Kosciusko County is part of Indiana's 2nd and 3rd congressional districts. It is also part of Indiana Senate districts 9, 13, 17 and 18 and Indiana House of Representatives districts 18, 22 and 23.

Elected officials:

- Jim Smith - Sheriff
- Brad Voelz - Prosecutor
- Gail Chapman - Assessor
- Alyssa Schmucker - Auditor
- Melissa Boggs - Clerk
- Deb Wright - County Recorder
- Michelle Puckett - Treasurer
- Cary P. Groninger - Middle District Commissioner
- Robert M. Conley, President - Southern District Commissioner
- Sue Ann Mitchell - Northern District Commissioner
- Tyler Huffer, Coroner
- Jim Moyer, Surveyor

Kosciusko County is a Republican stronghold in presidential elections. Woodrow Wilson in 1912 and Franklin D. Roosevelt in 1932 are the only two Democratic Party candidates to win the county from 1888 to the present day. Roosevelt is the only Democrat since 1888 to win the county with a majority. The county is very Republican even by the standards of traditionally Republican Indiana. For example, Roosevelt actually lost the county by eight percentage points in 1936 even as he went on to carry 46 states. Further underlining the county's Republican bent, it rejected Lyndon Johnson in 1964 even in the midst of Johnson's 44-state national landslide. Johnson is the last Democrat to manage even 40 percent of the county's vote.

United States presidential election results for Kosciusko County, Indiana
Year	Republican		Democratic		Third party(ies)	
Year	No.	%	No.	%	No.	%
1888	4,147	55.81%	3,081	41.46%	203	2.73%
1892	3,823	53.24%	3,064	42.67%	294	4.09%
1896	4,342	55.61%	3,372	43.19%	94	1.20%
1900	4,422	56.27%	3,265	41.54%	172	2.19%
1904	4,550	57.88%	2,913	37.06%	398	5.06%
1908	4,377	54.45%	3,362	41.82%	300	3.73%
1912	1,767	24.47%	2,817	39.02%	2,636	36.51%
1916	4,025	51.18%	3,447	43.83%	393	5.00%
1920	8,326	61.66%	4,836	35.81%	342	2.53%
1924	6,819	58.33%	4,384	37.50%	487	4.17%
1928	7,973	63.18%	4,537	35.95%	110	0.87%
1932	7,063	47.75%	7,475	50.54%	253	1.71%
1936	8,182	53.90%	6,890	45.39%	107	0.70%
1940	9,879	62.68%	5,768	36.60%	113	0.72%
1944	9,577	65.11%	4,865	33.08%	266	1.81%
1948	9,327	62.79%	5,102	34.35%	426	2.87%
1952	11,521	68.95%	4,677	27.99%	512	3.06%
1956	12,777	71.68%	4,904	27.51%	143	0.80%
1960	13,539	69.11%	5,839	29.80%	213	1.09%
1964	10,488	54.10%	8,759	45.18%	141	0.73%
1968	12,633	63.98%	5,342	27.06%	1,769	8.96%
1972	16,216	78.93%	4,233	20.60%	96	0.47%
1976	14,505	65.56%	7,328	33.12%	291	1.32%
1980	15,633	68.78%	5,684	25.01%	1,413	6.22%
1984	17,560	77.88%	4,877	21.63%	110	0.49%
1988	17,761	76.68%	5,321	22.97%	81	0.35%
1992	14,179	57.44%	5,307	21.50%	5,197	21.05%
1996	15,084	62.99%	6,166	25.75%	2,695	11.25%
2000	19,040	75.30%	5,785	22.88%	459	1.82%
2004	22,136	78.05%	5,977	21.08%	247	0.87%
2008	20,488	67.87%	9,236	30.60%	461	1.53%
2012	22,558	74.84%	6,862	22.77%	720	2.39%
2016	23,935	73.78%	6,313	19.46%	2,193	6.76%
2020	26,499	73.85%	8,364	23.31%	1,021	2.85%
2024	26,213	74.88%	7,995	22.84%	798	2.28%

=== Airports ===
- KASW - Warsaw Municipal Airport
- KC03 - Nappanee Municipal Airport

== Education ==
=== School districts ===
- Tippecanoe Valley School Corporation
- Triton School Corporation
- Warsaw Community Schools
- Wawasee Community School Corporation
- Whitko Community School Corporation
- Wa-Nee Community Schools

== Notable residents ==
- Ambrose Bierce, Civil War veteran, author, newspaper columnist
- Chris Schenkel, former Sportscaster for ABC Sports. Resided in Leesburg, Indiana.
- Rick Fox, retired NBA player. Resided in Warsaw, Indiana.
- Harrison Mevis, current NFL kicker for the Los Angeles Rams. Grew up in Warsaw, Indiana.

== See also ==
- National Register of Historic Places listings in Kosciusko County, Indiana
