= Virginia Apgar =

American physician and obstetrical anesthesiologist (1909–1974)

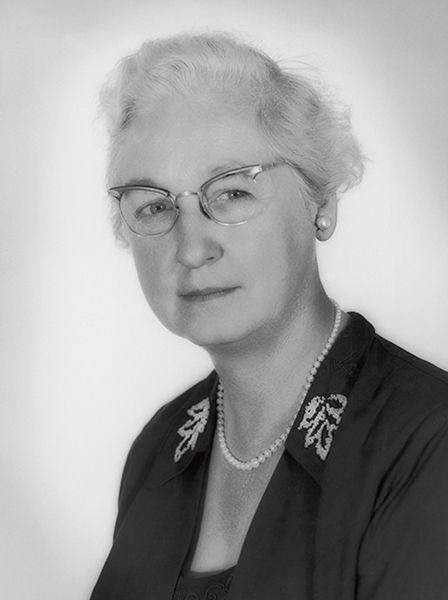
- Virginia Apgar (July 6, 1959)
- Born: June 7, 1909; Westfield, New Jersey, U.S.
- Died: August 7, 1974 (aged 65); Manhattan, New York, U.S.
- Education: Mount Holyoke College; Columbia University; Johns Hopkins University
- Occupation: Anesthesiologist
- Years active: 1937–1974
- Known for: Inventor of the Apgar score
- Medical career
- Profession: Doctor
- Field: Anesthesiology, teratology
- Sub-specialties: Obstetric anesthesiology
- Notable works: Is My Baby All Right? A Guide to Birth Defects, with Joan Beck

Virginia Apgar (June 7, 1909 – August 7, 1974) was an American physician, obstetrical anesthesiologist and medical researcher, best known as the inventor of the Apgar score, a way to quickly assess the health of a newborn child immediately after birth in order to combat infant mortality. In 1952, she developed the 10-point Apgar score to assist physicians and nurses in assessing the status of newborns. Given at one minute and five minutes after birth, the Apgar test measures a child's breathing, skin color, reflexes, motion, and heart rate. A friend said, "She probably did more than any other physician to bring the problem of birth defects out of back rooms." She was a leader in the fields of anesthesiology and teratology, and introduced obstetrical considerations to the established field of neonatology.

== Early life and education ==
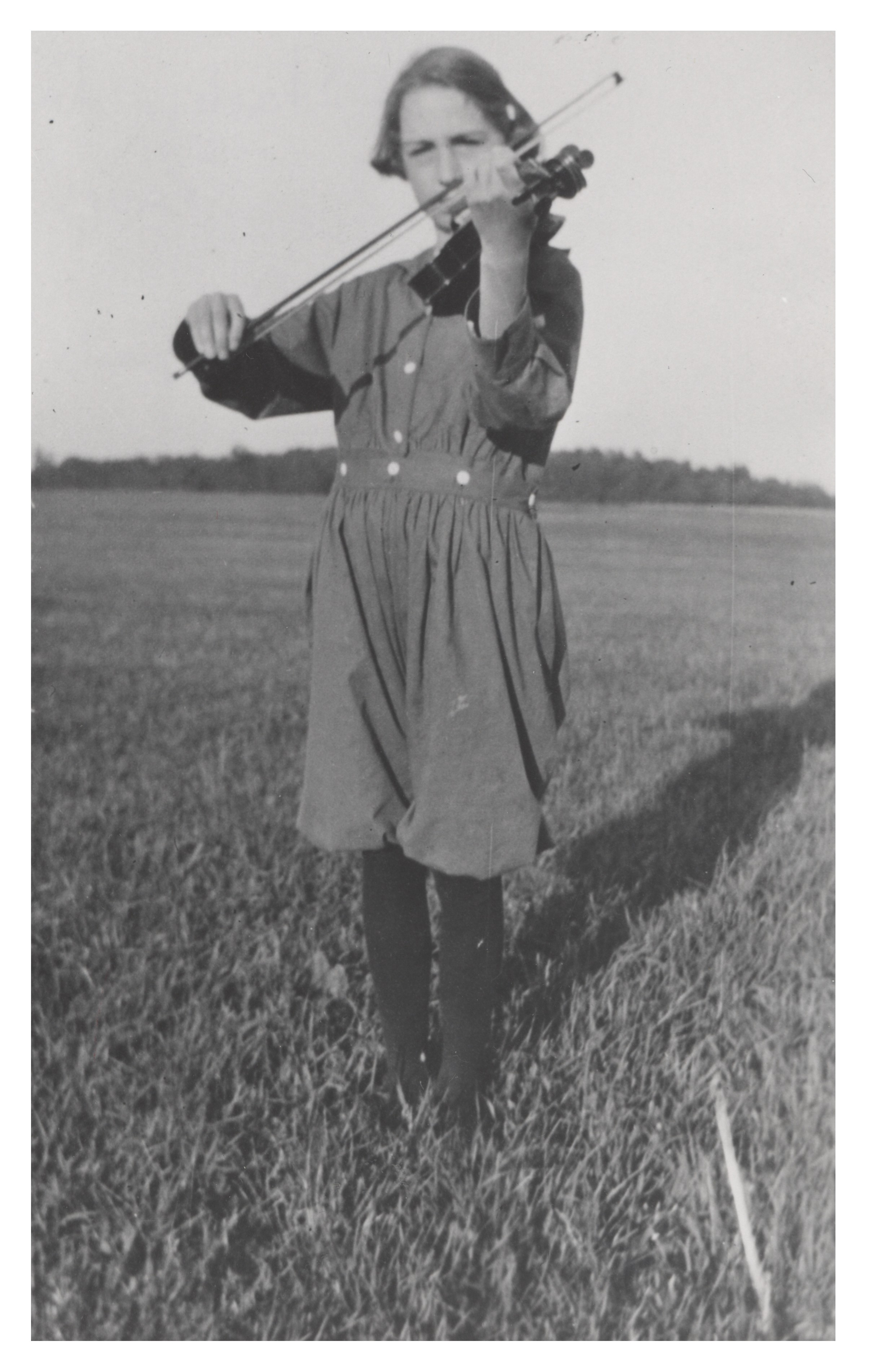
Apgar playing her violin in a field in 1920

The youngest of three children, Apgar was born and raised in Westfield, New Jersey, the daughter of Helen May (Clarke) and Charles Emory Apgar. Her father was a business executive and amateur astronomer whose amateur radio work exposed an espionage ring during World War I. Her older brother died early from tuberculosis, and her other brother had a chronic illness. She graduated from Westfield High School in 1925, knowing that she wanted to be a doctor from a young age.

Apgar graduated from Mount Holyoke College in 1929, where she studied zoology with minors in physiology and chemistry. In 1933, she graduated fourth in her class from Columbia University College of Physicians and Surgeons (P&S) and completed a residency in surgery at P&S in 1937. Apgar was one of nine women in her class of 90 medical students.

She was discouraged by Allen Whipple, the chairman of surgery at Columbia-Presbyterian Medical Center, from continuing her career as a surgeon because he had seen many women attempt to be successful surgeons and ultimately fail. He instead encouraged her to practice anesthesiology because he felt that advancements in anesthesia were needed to further advance surgery and felt that she had the "energy and ability" to make a significant contribution. Deciding to continue her career in anesthesiology, she trained for six months under Ralph Waters at the University of Wisconsin–Madison, where he had established the first anesthesiology department in the United States. In a 1937 photograph of Waters and his residents, she is the only woman among Waters and fifteen other men. She then studied for a further six months under Emery Rovenstine in New York at Bellevue Hospital. She received a certification as an anesthesiologist in 1937, and returned to P&S in 1938 as director of the newly formed division of anesthesia. She later received a master's degree in public health at Johns Hopkins School of Hygiene and Public Health, graduating in 1959.

== Work and research ==
Apgar was the first woman to head a specialty division at Columbia-Presbyterian Medical Center (now NewYork–Presbyterian Hospital) and Columbia University College of Physicians and Surgeons. In conjunction with Allen Whipple, she started P&S's anesthesia division. She was placed in charge of the division's administrative duties and was also tasked with co-ordinating the staffing of the division and its work throughout the hospital. Throughout much of the 1940s, she was an administrator, teacher, recruiter, coordinator and practicing physician.

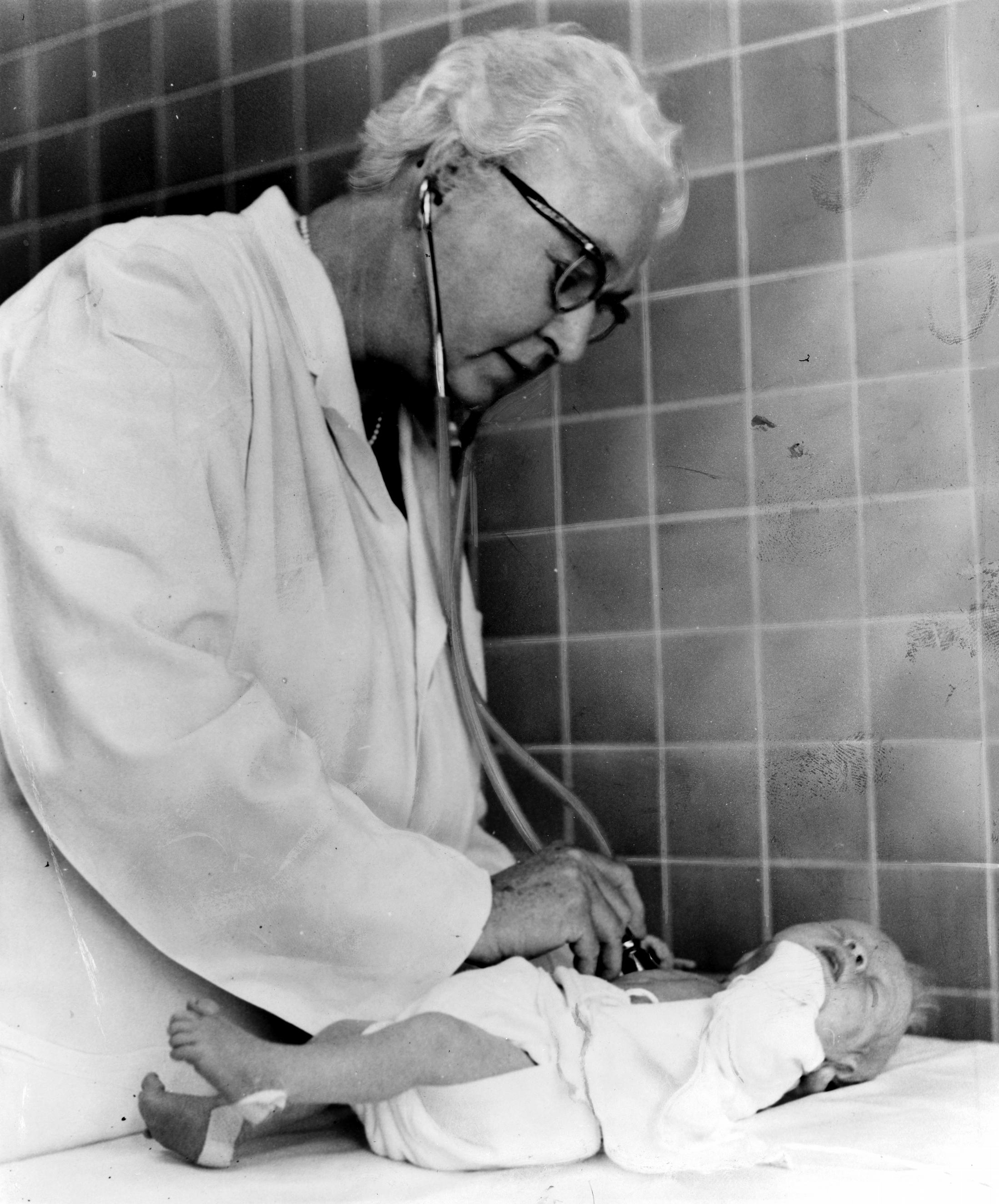
Apgar examining a newborn baby in 1966

It was often difficult to find residents for the program, as advances in the medical field had only recently elevated the practice of anesthesia to anesthesiology, a fully-fledged medical specialty. New anesthesiologists also faced scrutiny from other physicians, specifically surgeons, who were not used to having an anesthesia-specialized MD in the operating room. These difficulties led to issues in gaining funding and support for the division. With America's entrance into World War II in 1941, many medical professionals enlisted in the armed forces to help the war effort, which created a serious staffing problem for domestic hospitals, Apgar's division included.

When the war ended in 1945, interest in anesthesiology was renewed in returning physicians, and the staffing problem for Apgar's division was quickly resolved. The specialty's growing popularity and Apgar's development of its residency program prompted P&S to establish it as an official department in 1949. Due to her lack of research (because of her focus on clinical work), Apgar was not made the head of the department as was expected and the job was given to her colleague, Emmanuel Papper. Apgar was given a faculty position at P&S.

=== Obstetrics ===
In 1949, Apgar became the first woman to become a full professor at P&S, where she remained until 1959. During this time, she also did clinical and research work at the affiliated Sloane Hospital for Women, still a division of NewYork–Presbyterian Hospital. In 1953, she introduced the first test, called the Apgar score, to assess the health of newborn babies.

Between the 1930s and the 1950s, the United States infant mortality rate decreased, but the number of infant deaths within the first 24 hours after birth remained constant. Apgar noticed this trend and began to investigate methods for decreasing the infant mortality rate specifically within the first 24 hours of the infant's life. As an obstetric anesthesiologist, Apgar was able to document trends that could distinguish healthy infants from infants in trouble.

This investigation led to a standardized scoring system used to assess a newborn's health after birth, with the result referred to as the newborn's "Apgar score". Each newborn is given a score of 0, 1 or 2 (a score of 2 meaning the newborn is in optimal condition, 0 being in distress) in each of the following categories: heart rate, respiration, color, muscle tone and reflex irritability. Compiled scores for each newborn can range between 0 and 10, with 10 being the best possible condition for a newborn. The scores were to be given to a newborn one minute after birth, and additional scores could be given in five-minute increments to guide treatment if the newborn's condition did not sufficiently improve. By the 1960s, many hospitals in the United States were using the Apgar score consistently. In the 21st century, the score continues to be used to provide an accepted and convenient method for reporting the status of the newborn infant immediately after birth .

In 1959, Apgar left Columbia and earned a Master of Public Health degree from the Johns Hopkins School of Hygiene and Public Health. From 1959 until her death in 1974, Apgar worked for the March of Dimes Foundation, serving as vice president for medical affairs and directing its research program to prevent and treat birth defects.

As gestational age is directly related to an infant's Apgar score, Apgar was one of the first at the March of Dimes to bring attention to the problem of premature birth, now one of the March of Dimes' top priorities. During this time, she wrote and lectured extensively, writing articles in popular magazines as well as research work. In 1967, Apgar became vice president and director of basic research at The National Foundation-March of Dimes.

During the rubella pandemic of 1964–65, Apgar became an advocate for universal vaccination to prevent mother-to-child transmission of rubella. Rubella can cause serious congenital disorders if a woman becomes infected while pregnant. Between 1964 and 1965, the United States had an estimated 12.5 million rubella cases, which led to 11,000 miscarriages or therapeutic abortions and 20,000 cases of congenital rubella syndrome. These led to 2,100 deaths in infancy, 12,000 cases of deafness, 3,580 cases of blindness due to cataracts and/or microphthalmia and 1,800 cases of intellectual disability. In New York City alone, congenital rubella affected 1% of all babies born at that time. Apgar also promoted effective use of Rh testing, which can identify women who are at risk for transmission of maternal antibodies across the placenta where they may subsequently bind with and destroy fetal red blood cells, resulting in fetal hydrops or even miscarriage.

Apgar traveled thousands of miles each year to speak to widely varied audiences about the importance of early detection of birth defects and the need for more research in this area. She proved an excellent ambassador for the National Foundation, and the annual income of that organization more than doubled during her tenure there. She also served the National Foundation as Director of Basic Medical Research (1967–1968) and vice-president for Medical Affairs (1971–1974). Her concerns for the welfare of children and families were combined with her talent for teaching in the 1972 book Is My Baby All Right?, written with Joan Beck.

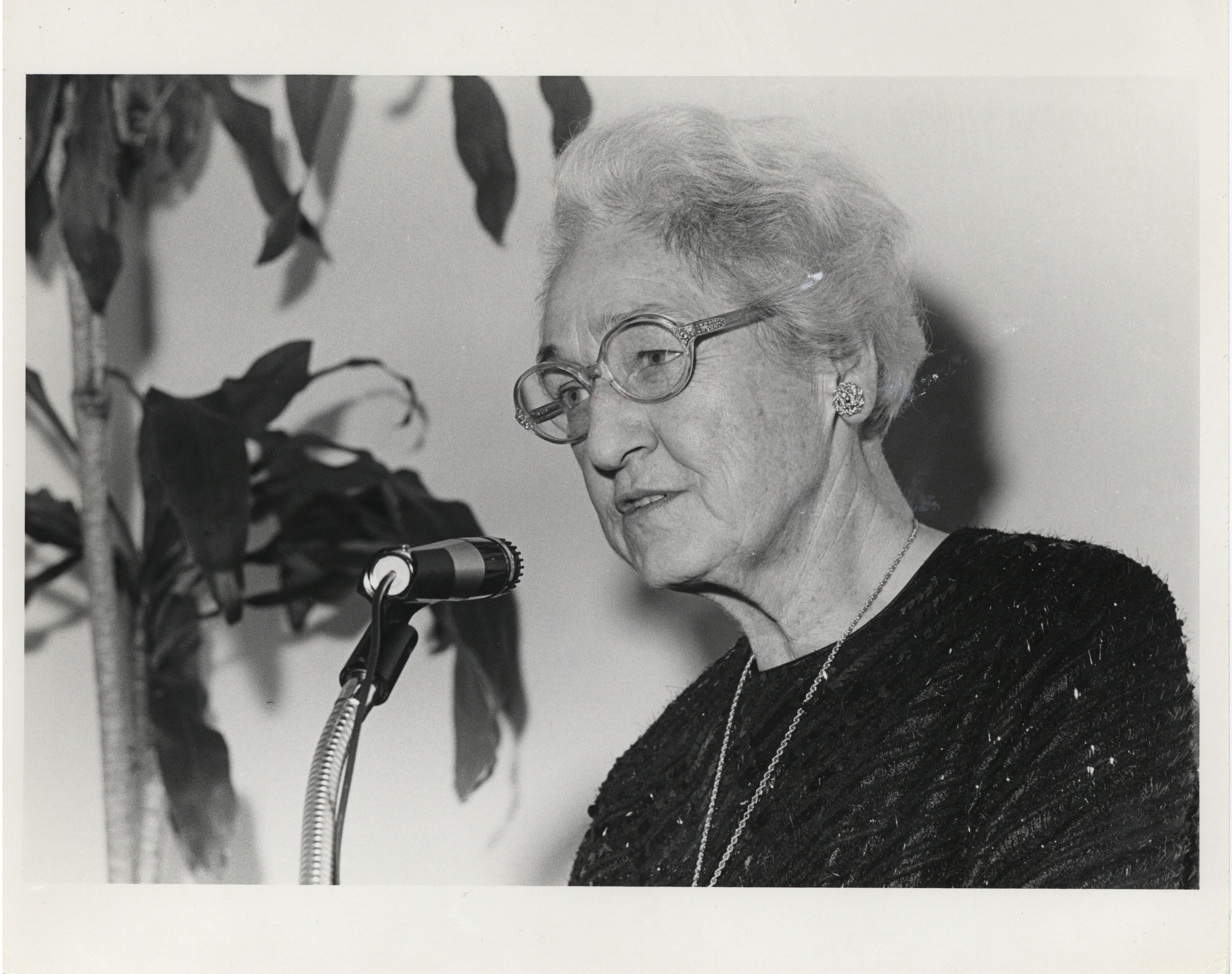
Apgar on the President's Committee on Employment of the Handicapped (November 28, 1973)

Apgar was also a lecturer (1965–1971) and then clinical professor (1971–1974) of pediatrics at Cornell University School of Medicine, where she taught teratology (the study of birth defects). She was the first to hold a faculty position in this new area of pediatrics. In 1973, she was appointed a lecturer in medical genetics at the Johns Hopkins School of Public Health.

Apgar published over sixty scientific articles and numerous shorter essays for newspapers and magazines during her career, along with her book, Is My Baby All Right?. She received many awards, including honorary doctorates from the Woman's Medical College of Pennsylvania (1964) and Mount Holyoke College (1965), the Elizabeth Blackwell Award from the American Medical Women's Association (1966), the Distinguished Service Award from the American Society of Anesthesiologists (1966), the Alumni Gold Medal for Distinguished Achievement from Columbia University College of Physicians and Surgeons (1973) and the Ralph M. Waters Award from the American Society of Anesthesiologists (1973). In 1973 she was also elected Woman of the Year in Science by the Ladies Home Journal.

Apgar was equally at home speaking to teens as she was to the movers and shakers of society. She spoke at March of Dimes Youth Conferences about teen pregnancy and congenital disorders at a time when these topics were considered taboo.

== Apgar score ==
The Apgar score was born when Apgar was asked by an obstetrical resident what his newborn examination should cover, she wrote on a napkin five categories in which a newborn child should be evaluated, including appearance, pulse, grimace (reflexes to touch), activity, and respiration. The Apgar score is conducted at least two times, first sixty seconds after birth to determine if resuscitation or intervention is necessary, then again at five minutes after birth. Each section of the five category scale is worth a maximum of two points. Apgar noted newborns that received cumulative scores of 0-2 had an infant death rate of 14%, infants who scored 3-7 had a death rate of 1.1%, and the infants who received scores of 8-10 had a very low mortality rate of 0.13% Apgar later examined the scale to determine the effects of birth on the baby, they concluded that the common problems effecting newborns after birth was hypoxia and acidosis. Apgar hoped to use the Apgar score as a way to cease unnecessary intervention with a healthy baby, and lessen these effects. Over the years, the Apgar score has proved a consistent and efficient way to evaluate the overall health of a newborn baby, becoming a procedure used in most U.S hospitals.

Criteria	0 Points	1 Point	2 Points
Appearance	Blue/Pale	Pink body, blue limbs	Pink all over/healthy color
Pulse	0	Below 100 BPM	Above 100 BPM
Grimace (reflexes)	No response	Weak cry or coo	Clear cry or cough
Activity (muscle tone)	No response to touch	Some response to touch	Active/healthy response to stimulation
Respiration	Absent	Irregular breathing/respiration	Strong cry, no sign of obstruction

== Other discoveries ==
Apgar was also responsible for the discoveries and interventions of numerous other maternal/baby ailments.

•Anesthetics such as meperidine and cyclopropane unhealthily interfere with the barrier of the placenta, causing stress and pushing on the baby.

•Resuscitation being used on babies during the time was not correct and causing more harm than good.

•Babies born by cesarean section under spinal anesthesia tended to receive better Apgar scores compared to those who were delivered under general anesthesia.

•Discovered 55% of children diagnosed with cerebral palsy had received an Apgar score of 7 out of 10 at one minute and 73% received an Apgar score of 7 out of 10 at five minutes.

== Personal life ==
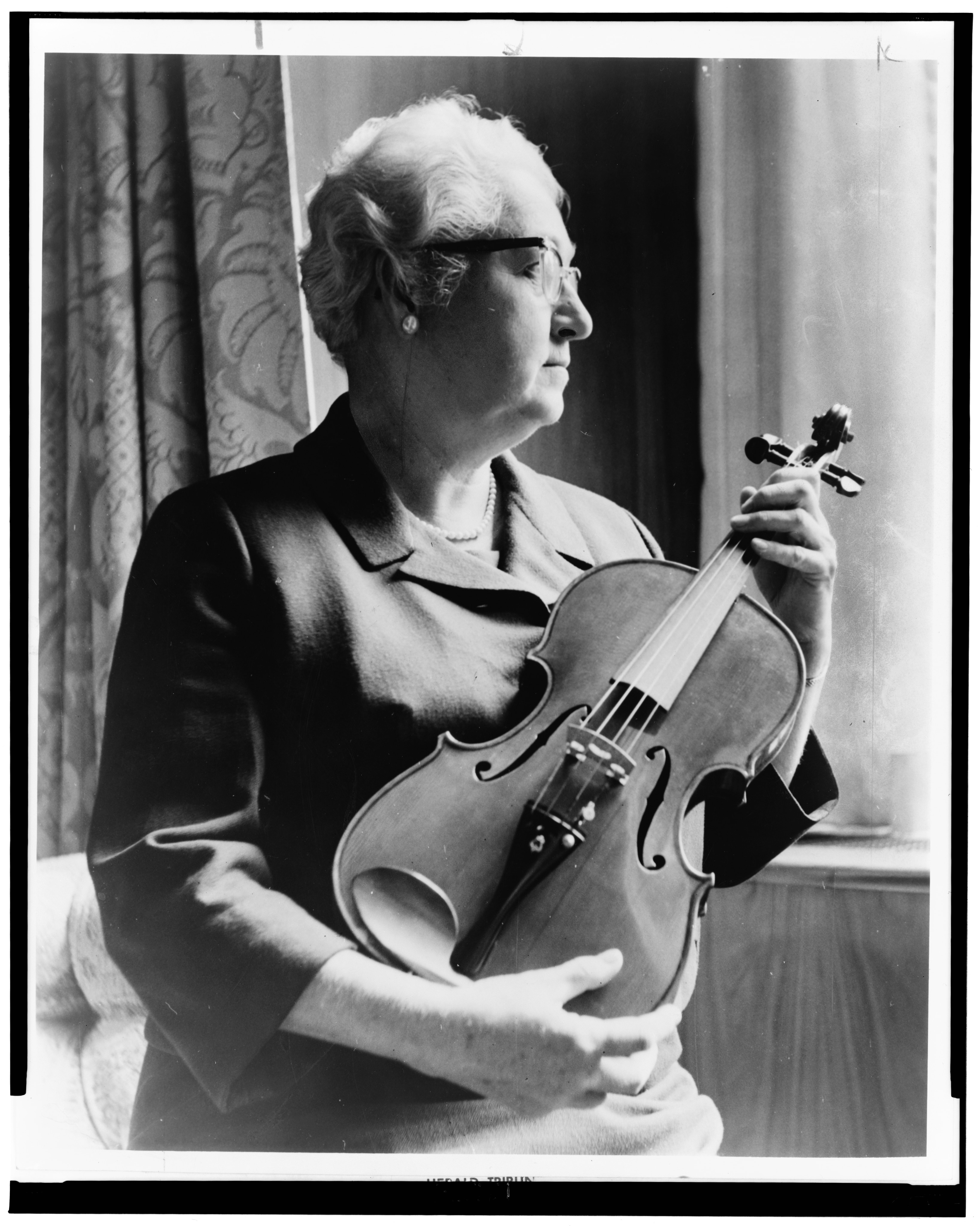
Apgar with a self-made violin (60s)

Throughout her career, Apgar maintained that "women are liberated from the time they leave the womb" and that being female had not imposed significant limitations on her medical career. She avoided women's organizations and causes, for the most part. Though she sometimes privately expressed her frustration with sex inequalities (especially in the matter of salaries), she worked around these by consistently pushing into new fields where there was room to exercise her considerable energy and abilities.

Music was an integral part of family life, with frequent family music sessions. Apgar played the violin and her brother played piano and organ. She traveled with her violin, often playing in amateur chamber quartets wherever she happened to be. During the 1950s, a friend introduced her to instrument-making, and together they made two violins, a viola and a cello. She was an enthusiastic gardener and enjoyed fly-fishing, golfing and stamp collecting. In her fifties, Apgar started taking flying lessons, stating that her goal was to someday fly under New York's George Washington Bridge.

=== Death ===
Apgar never married or had children and died of cirrhosis on August 7, 1974, at Columbia-Presbyterian Medical Center. She is buried at Fairview Cemetery in Westfield.

== Legacy ==
Apgar has continued to earn posthumous recognition for her contributions and achievements. In 1994, she was honored by the United States Postal Service with a 20¢ Great Americans series postage stamp. In November 1995, she was inducted into the National Women's Hall of Fame in Seneca Falls, New York. In 1999, she was designated a Women's History Month Honoree by the National Women's History Project. On June 7, 2018, Google celebrated Apgar's 109th birthday with a Google Doodle.

== Honors and awards ==
- Honorary doctorate, Women's Medical College of Pennsylvania (1964)
- Honorary doctorate, Mount Holyoke College (1965)
- Distinguished Service Award from the American Society of Anesthesiologists (1966)
- Elizabeth Blackwell Award, from the American Women's Medical Association (1966)
- Honorary doctorate, New Jersey College of Medicine and Dentistry (1967)
- Alumni Gold Medal for Distinguished Achievement, Columbia University College of Physicians and Surgeons (1973)
- Ralph M. Waters Award, American Society of Anesthesiologists (1973)
- Woman of the Year in Science, Ladies Home Journal (1973)
- Fellow of the New York Academy of Medicine, the American Public Health Association, and the New York Academy of Sciences.
- Inductee into the New Jersey Hall of Fame (2020)

== Selected works ==
- Apgar, Virginia; Beck, Joan Wagner (1972). Is my baby all right? A guide to birth defect. New York: Trident Press. ISBN 9780671270957. OCLC 578207.
- Apgar, Virginia (1953). "A proposal for a new method of evaluation of the newborn infant". Current Researches in Anesthesia & Analgesia. 32 (4): 260–267. PMID 13083014. Archived from the original on November 30, 2012.
