= Emery Andrew Rovenstine =

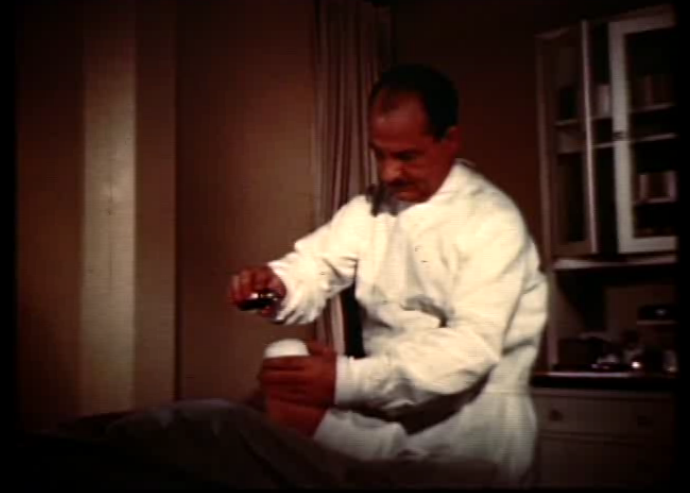
- Rovenstine administering an anesthetic
- Born: July 20, 1895; Atwood, Indiana, U.S.
- Died: November 9, 1960 (aged 65); New York, U.S.
- Education: Wabash College, Indiana University
- Medical career
- Profession: Physician
- Sub-specialties: Anesthesiology

Emery Andrew Rovenstine (July 20, 1895 – November 9, 1960) was an American anesthesiologist best known for organizing the first academic Department of Anesthesiology at New York's Bellevue Hospital. He also helped develop the anesthetic use for the gas cyclopropane, and he was a pioneer in therapeutic nerve blocking. Upon his death in 1960, the New York Times proclaimed him "one of the world's foremost anesthesiologists."

== Early life ==
Dr. Rovenstine was born in 1895, in Atwood, Indiana, where he clerked at his father's grocery store. He briefly attended Winona College in nearby Winona Lake and taught high school before moving on to Wabash College, where he was graduated in 1917. Upon graduation, Rovenstine enlisted in the Army and served in France during World War I. During his three years of active duty, much of which he spent in charge of an engineering demolition squad, he witnessed battlefield pain and suffering which inspired him to pursue a career in medicine.

== Medical career ==
After returning home for several years of teaching and coaching, he decided to attend medical school at Indiana University, from which he received a degree in medicine in 1928. In 1930, after struggling to maintain a general practice during economically difficult times, he took a faculty post at the University of Wisconsin–Madison, where he studied under Dr. Ralph M. Waters and served as assistant professor of anesthesia. He and Waters experimented on the gas cyclopropane and were the first doctors to use it on human subjects.

In 1935, Rovenstine was appointed chair of the department of anesthesiology at Bellevue Hospital, where he was influential in shaping the department's mission and mentoring future generations of anesthesiologists. During this time he developed a nerve blocking technique and became the first anesthesiologist to set up a nerve blocking clinic for pain relief. Two years later, he was appointed the second American professor of anesthesiology at New York University School of Medicine.

He became director at Goldwater Memorial Hospital in 1938 and director at University Hospital a decade later. Also in 1938, he accepted a guest professorship at Oxford University in England, and, a year later, at University of Rosario in Argentina. He also accepted visiting appointments in Bohemia, Canada, Cuba, Czechoslovakia, France, Japan, Mexico and South Africa – and was inducted into the medical society of each respective nation.

During World War II, Rovenstine served on the Army Advisory Board and was responsible for an order to Army general hospitals placing operating rooms in charge of anesthesiologists. The practice later became general.

Rovenstine was a co-founder of the reorganized American Society of Anesthesiologists and served as its president from 1943 to 1944. In 1957, he received that Society's Distinguished Service Award. He was also the founder of the PostGraduate Assembly (PGA) in Anesthesiology and the American Board of Anesthesiology.

He was honored by numerous organizations and governments, notably being decorated at the Verdun by the French government (for his service in the war), and being decorated by the Order of the White Lion in Czechoslovakia (for a humanitarian teaching mission there).

== Residents ==
Among Rovenstine's notable residents at Bellevue were Stuart Cullen, Emanuel Papper, Virginia Apgar, Perry Volpitto, John Adriani, Louis Orkin, Sam Denson, Richard Ament, Gertie Marx, Martin Helrich, Sara Joffe, and Lewis Wright. Irwin Glasner

== Rovenstine Lectureship ==
The Emery A. Rovenstine Memorial Lecture series began in 1962, shortly following Dr. Rovenstine's death. The lecture is delivered by a prominent anesthesiologist each year at the annual American Society of Anesthesiologists meeting, and has become the meeting's premier event.

Year	Lecturer	Title
1962	Francis D. Moore, M.D.	Hemorrhage
1963	Julius H. Comroe, Jr., M.D., Ph.D.	The Regulation of Respiration
1964	Eugene Braunwald, M.D.	The Control of Cardiac Function
1965	Louis Lasagna, M.D.	The Principles and Pitfalls in Evaluation of New Drugs
1966	E. M. Papper, M.D.	Regional Anesthesia - A Critical Assessment of Its Place in Therapeutics
1967	Arthur C. Guyton, M.D.	The Regulation of Cardiac Output
1968	Hermann Rahn, M.D.	Evolution of Gas Transport Mechanisms from Fish to Man
1969	Niels A. Lassen, M.D.	Cerebral Circulation and the Anesthetist: An Appraisal of Practical Consequences of Present Knowledge.
1970	Robert D. Dripps, M.D.	The Physician and Society
1971	Julius Axelrod, M.D.	Biochemical Factors in the Inactivation and Activation of Drugs
1972	Stuart C. Cullen, M.D.	Factors Influencing Education in Anesthesiology
1973	William W. Mushin, M.B., B.S.	The Decline and Fall of the Anesthesiologist?
1974	Otto K. Mayrhofer, M.D.	How Can Acupuncture-Analgesia be Blended into the Modern Practice of Anaesthesiology?
1975	Harry C. Churchill-Davidson, M.D.	Clinical Observation
1976	Francis D. Moore, M.D.	Anesthesia and Surgical Care
1977	James E. Eckenhoff, M.D.	A Wideangle View of Anesthesiology
1978	William K. Hamilton, M.D.	Stress and Anesthesia
1979	Leroy D. Vandam, M.D.	Anesthesiologists as Clinicians
1980	M. T. Pepper Jenkins, M.D.	Responsibility for the Future
1981	E. S. Siker, M.D.	A Measure of Worth
1982	S. G. Hershey, M.D.	The Rovenstine Inheritance: A Chain of Leadership
1983	Arthur S. Keats, M.D.	Cardiovascular Anesthesia: Perceptions and Perspectives
1984	Eugene A. Stead, Jr., M.D.	The Physician: Education and Training
1985	John Lansdale, Esq.	Anesthesiology: The Search for Identity
1986	Edward R. Annis, M.D.	New Challenges—New Opportunities
1987	John F. Nunn, M.D., Ph.D.	Balancing the Risks with the New Gases
1988	John D. Michenfelder, M.D.	Neuroanesthesia and the Professional Respect
1989	Thomas F. Hornbein, M.D.	Lessons from On High
1990	Robert K. Stoelting, M.D.	Clinical Challenges for the Anesthesiologist
1991	Alan R. Nelson, M.D.	Medicine 2000: Expectations, Realities and Values
1992	Nicholas M. Greene, M.D	The Changing Horizons in Anesthesiology
1993	Betty J. Bamforth, M.D.	Learning from our Past
1994	Lawrence J. Saidman, M.D.	What I Have Learned after Nine Years and 9,000 Papers
1995	Ellison C. Pierce, Jr., M.D.	40 Years Behind the Mask: Safety Revisited
1996	David E. Longnecker, M.D.	Navigation in Uncharted Waters: Is Anesthesiology on Course for the 21st Century?
1997	Michael J. Cousins, M.D.	Pain: The Past, Present, and Future of Anesthesiology
1998	Francis M. James, III, M.D.	Who Will Lead Us?
1999	Carl C. Hug Jr., M.D., Ph.D.	Patient Values, Hippocrates, Science and Technology
2000	James F. Arens, M.D.	Rovenstine Legacy 40 Years Later in Y2K
2001	Glenn W. Johnson	ASA: Education, Science & Advocacy—Past, Present and Future
2002	Burton S. Epstein, M.D.	ASA's Efforts In Developing Guidelines for Sedation and Analgesia for Nonanesthesiologists
2003	Terri G. Monk, M.D.	Postoperative Cognitive Dysfunction: The Next challenge In Geriatric Anesthesia
2004	Jerome H. Modell, M.D	Assessing the Past and Shaping the Future Of Anesthesiology
2005	Mark A. Warner, M.D.	Who Better than Anesthesiologists?
2006	Jerry Reves, M.D.	We Are What We Make
2007	James E. Cottrell, M.D.	We Care, Therefore, We Are: Anesthesia-Related Morbidity and Mortality
2008	Ronald D. Miller, M.D.	The Pursuit of Excellence
2009	Peter J. Pronovost, M.D., Ph.D.	We Need Leaders
2010	Kevin K. Tremper, Ph.D., M.D.	Anesthesiology: From Patient Safety to Population Outcomes
2011	Patricia A. Kapur, M.D.	Leading into the Future
2012	Jeffrey L. Apfelbaum, M.D.	Safety in Numbers: The Genesis, Development, and Future of ASA Practice Parameters
2013	John B. Neeld, Jr., M.D	Winning the War
2014	Karen B. Domino, M.D., M.P.H.	Health Care at the Crossroads: The Imperative for Change
2015	James Eisenach, M.D.	Without Science There is Little Art in Anesthesiology
2016	David H. Chestnut, M.D	On the Road to Professionalism
2017	Lee A. Fleisher, M.D.	Quality Anesthesia: Medicine Measures, Patients Decide
2018	John M. Zerwas, M.D	Mentoring the Next Generation of Leaders
2019	Jerome Adams, M.D.	The Future of the Physician Anesthesiologist
2020	Joanne M. Conroy, M.D.	Vital Signs: Transforming 21st Century Anesthesia Practice
2021	Steve Shafer, M.D.	Ever Eger: My Love Affair with Anesthesia
2022	Claude D. Brunson, M.D.	Demonstrating ASA's Leadership by Enhancing Our Relationships: How We Can Do D.E.I. Better
2023	Daniel Sessler, M.D.	The Gathering Storm
2024	Mary Dale Peterson, M.D.	Our Finest Hour-How Anesthesiologists Saved Countless Lives during the COVID-19 Pandemic
2025	Sachin Kheterpal, M.D., M.B.A.	Anesthesiologists as Leaders in a Data Driven World

== Athletics ==
Athletics played a significant role in Rovenstine's life. His first encounter with an anesthesiologist was during a high school basketball game, when he head-butted Arthur Ernest Guedel, a prominent scholar who happened to be officiating. Guedel threw the boy over his knee and gave him a spanking. He later studied under Guedel at Indiana University, and it was Guedel who helped Rovenstine secure the post at the University of Wisconsin.

At Wabash College, Rovenstine played baseball, basketball, football, and was sports editor of the school's newspaper. He also played semi-profession baseball on the side under the name "Jack Andrews."

Rovenstine coached basketball himself at LaPorte High School in LaPorte, Indiana from 1920 to 1924, where he still has the best winning percentage in the school's history.

Year	Won	Lost
1920 - 1921	14	5
1921 - 1922	18	2
1922 - 1923	13	8
1923 - 1924	11	10
Career Total	56	25
