= John Adriani =

American anesthesiologist

- Born: December 2, 1907; Bridgeport, Connecticut
- Died: June 14, 1988 (aged 80); New Orleans, Louisiana
- Medical career
- Profession: Physician
- Field: Anesthesiology
- Institutions: Charity Hospital

John Adriani (December 2, 1907 – June 14, 1988) was an American anesthesiologist and director of anesthesiology at Charity Hospital in New Orleans. He was president of the American Board of Anesthesiology (ABA) and he received a Distinguished Service Award from the American Society of Anesthesiologists (ASA). He was an early supporter of physician involvement in nurse anesthetist training.

== Early life and education ==
Adriani was born in Bridgeport, Connecticut. He was the oldest of nine children. His parents were Italian immigrants. After attending high school in Bridgeport, he earned an undergraduate degree from Columbia College and a medical degree from the Columbia College of Physicians and Surgeons.

As a medical student, Adriani, who remembered receiving only one anesthesia-related lecture in school, experienced the death of one of his patients from a poorly understood complication, malignant hyperthermia. The experience inspired him to study anesthesiology as a career path. He trained in anesthesiology at Bellevue Hospital and NYU Medical Center. During his training, he was mentored by influential anesthesiologist Emery Andrew Rovenstine. After completing his training with Rovenstine, Adriani stayed on his staff as an instructor.

== Career ==
In 1941, Adriani became director of anesthesiology at Charity Hospital. The hospital had been constructed two years earlier, and its anesthesia services were disorganized, with poorly trained personnel often administering the anesthetic to patients in the operating room. Adriani worked with physicians and nurses, lecturing to them on anesthesia-related topics. The result was that Charity developed an anesthesia residency program for physicians as well as an accredited school of nurse anesthesia. While Adriani was at Charity, he served on the faculty at the Tulane University School of Medicine and the LSU School of Medicine. In addition to his anesthesia work, he established Charity's blood bank and bone bank, and he directed the hospital's inhalation therapists.

In the 1940s, the ABA and ASA held a philosophy that it was unethical for physicians to assist in the training of nurse anesthetists. The ABA went further, saying that they prohibited anesthesiologists from lecturing at meetings of nurse anesthetists and threatening to cancel the board certifications of anesthesiologists who participated in such training. Adriani resisted, telling an ABA official that he would bring a case in federal court if they revoked his certification. The ABA relented then officially dropped the policy in 1965; this change of direction was informally known as the Adriani rule.

Adriani was awarded the fifth Distinguished Service Award from the ASA in 1949, and he sat on the board of directors for the ABA from 1960 to 1972. He served as ABA president for one term, and he was a member of the examinations committee who shaped the ABA's modern board certification process.

== Later life ==
In the late 1960s, Adriani received an appointment to head the Bureau of Medicine at the Food and Drug Administration (FDA). However, the FDA appointment was withdrawn based on pressure from the pharmaceutical industry because of controversial statements that Adriani made about drug labeling. Adriani felt that brand name labeling increased consumer confusion around medications, and he had argued that drug companies should only be allowed to label their medicines with generic names.

Adriani officially retired in 1974, but he had a continued presence at Charity Hospital even in retirement. He died of diverticulitis in 1988.
