= Ralph M. Waters =

American anesthesiologist (1883–1979)

Ralph Milton Waters
- Born: October 9, 1883; Bloomfield, Ohio
- Died: December 19, 1979 (aged 96)
- Education: Western Reserve University,
- Occupation(s): Physician; Anesthesiology
- Notable work: University of Wisconsin School of Medicine

Ralph Milton Waters (October 9, 1883 – December 19, 1979) was an American anesthesiologist known for introducing professionalism into the practice of anesthesia.

== Medical career ==
Waters attended Western Reserve University Medical School and started a private practice focusing on obstetrics in Sioux City, Iowa upon graduation. Eventually, he turned the attention of his practice to anesthesia. In 1919, he published the landmark paper, "Why The Professional Anesthetist", describing the inadequacies of anesthetic practices across the country.

By 1927, his reputation had grown such that he was recruited as a professor at the University of Wisconsin. There, he set up the country's first separate department of anesthesia at a medical school and established a resident training program in anesthesia. For example, the photograph shows Dr. Waters in 1937, with fifteen male residents and one female resident, Dr. Virginia Apgar.

Among his contributions to the field were the development of the gas cyclopropane for clinical use, beginning in the 1930s; the carbon dioxide absorption method; and endobronchial anesthesia for thoracic surgery.

Waters was instrumental in outsourcing his resident training model to other universities and hospitals, including Bellevue Hospital, where he sent his assistant, Emery Rovenstine in 1935; and the University of Pennsylvania, where his protege Robert Dripps implemented the model. He invented an oropharyngeal airway made up of metal, now known as Waters' Airway.
