= Hoffman Lake, Indiana =

- Census-designated place
- Location within Indiana Location within the United States
- Coordinates: 41°16′21″N 85°59′19″W
- Country: United States
- State: Indiana
- County: Kosciusko
- Township: Prairie

Area
  - Total: 1.01 sq mi (2.6 km^{2})
  - Land: 0.70 sq mi (1.8 km^{2})
  - Water: 0.31 sq mi (0.80 km^{2})
- Elevation: 784 ft (239 m)
- Time zone: UTC-5 (Eastern (EST))
  - Summer (DST): UTC-4 (EDT)
- ZIP code: 46582 (Warsaw)
- Area code: 574
- FIPS code: 18-34186
- GNIS feature ID: 2830431

Hoffman Lake is an unincorporated community and census-designated place (CDP) in Kosciusko County, Indiana, United States.

== Geography ==
The community is in western Kosciusko County, surrounding the natural water body of Hoffman Lake. It is bordered to the south by U.S. Route 30, which leads east 8 miles (13 km) to Warsaw, the county seat, and northwest 18 miles (29 km) to Plymouth. Hoffman Lake is bordered to the southeast, across US 30, by the unincorporated community of Atwood.

According to the U.S. Census Bureau, the Hoffman Lake CDP has a total area of 1.01 square miles (2.62 km^{2}), of which 0.70 square miles (1.81 km^{2}) are land and 0.31 square miles (0.80 km^{2}), or 30.72%, are water. The lake drains at its south end into Robinson Ditch, which flows southwest 2 miles (3 km) to the Tippecanoe River, part of the Wabash River watershed.

== Demographics ==
The United States Census Bureau delineated Hoffman Lake as a census designated place in the 2022 American Community Survey.
