= Donna Baier Stein =

American poet

- Born: Kansas City, Missouri
- Occupations: Writer, publisher, copywriter
- Writing career
- Genres: Fiction, poetry, non-fiction
- Website: www.donnabaierstein.com

Donna Baier Stein is an American author, publisher, and copywriter.

== Biography ==
Donna is the author of The Silver Baron's Wife, Sympathetic People, Sometimes You Sense the Difference, Letting Rain Have Its Say (poetry book), and Scenes from the Heartland: Stories Based on Lithographs by Thomas Hart Benton. She was a founding editor of Bellevue Literary Review and founded and publishes Tiferet an interfaith literary journal. She has received a Bread Loaf Scholarship, Johns Hopkins University Seminars Fellowship, grants from the New Jersey Council on the Arts and Poetry Society of Virginia, and a Scholarship from the Summer Literary Seminars.

Donna's writing have appeared in Next Avenue, Virginia Quarterly Review, The Saturday Evening Post, Writer's Digest, Confrontation, Prairie Schooner, New York Quarterly, Washingtonian, New Ohio Review as well as in the anthologies I've Always Meant to Tell You (Pocket Books), To Fathers: What I've Never Said (featured in O Magazine).

She was a freelance direct marketing copywriter from 1980 to 2014, writing for Smithsonian, World Wildlife Fund, Time-Life, The Nature Conservancy and other publishers and environmental groups. She created seminars on copywriting for the Direct Marketing Association and has taught copywriting and creative writing at universities and organizations. Her two nonfiction books on copywriting are Write on Target (co-authored with Floyd Kemske and published by McGraw Hill) and The New Marketing Conversation (co-authored with Alex MacAaron and published by Thomson Publishing Group).

Baier Stein was named Direct Marketer of the Year by the New England Direct Marketing Association in 2004.

Three of her short stories have been turned into plays and read at Salmagundi Club in New York in 2023 and 2024, with a professional cast of actors. Her short story "On the Banks of the Save" was a quarter-finalist in the 2015 ScreenCraft Short Story Awards.

== Books ==
- Scenes from the Heartland (Stories, Serving House Books, 2019)
- Letting Rain Have Its Say (Poetry, Kelsay Books, 2018)
- The Silver Baron's Wife (Novel, Serving House Books, 2016)
- Sympathetic People (Stories, Serving House Books, 2013)
- Sometimes You Sense the Difference (Poetry, Finishing Line Press, 2012)
- The New Marketing Conversation with Alexandra MacAaron: Creating and Strengthening Relationships (Racom Communications, 2004)
- Tiferet Journal (Founder and Publisher, 2004–Present)
- To Fathers: What I’ve Never Said (contributor, Story Line Press, 2001)
- Write on Target: The Direct Marketers Copywriting Handbook (with Floyd Kemske, McGraw-Hill, 1997)
- I’ve Always Meant to Tell You; Letters to Our Mothers – An Anthology of Contemporary Women Writers (contributor, Pocket Books, 1997)

== Awards and honors ==
- Foreword Indies finalist for Scenes from the Heartland
- PEN/New England Discovery Award for The Silver Baron's Wife
- Bronze winner in Foreword Reviews 2017 Book of the Year Award for The Silver Baron's Wife
- Will Rogers Medallion Award finalist for The Silver Baron's Wife
- Paterson Prize for Fiction for The Silver Baron's Wife
- Iowa Fiction Award Finalist for Sympathetic People
- Next Generation Indie Book Awards Finalist in Short Fiction for Sympathetic People
- Scholarship from Bread Loaf Writers Conference
- Awards from the Poetry Societies of Virginia and New Hampshire Poetry Society
- Fellowship from Johns Hopkins University Writing Seminars
- Fellowship from the New Jersey Council on the Arts
