= Incidental Findings =

Collection of essays by physician-writer Danielle Ofri

A collection of essays by physician-writer Danielle Ofri, Incidental Findings: Lessons from my Patients in the Art of Medicine is the story of Ofri practicing medicine in small towns across America, then returning to teach and practice at Bellevue Hospital, America's oldest public hospital. It was published by Beacon Press. Ofri writes about dealing with patients speaking every language and of the challenge of training the next generation of doctors. She also writes about her experience being a patient.

The essay Living Will from Incidental Findings was selected by Susan Orlean for Best American Essays 2005. The essay Common Ground from Incidental Findings was selected by Oliver Sacks for Best American Science Writing 2003 and given Honorable Mention by Anne Fadiman for Best American Essays 2004.

Ofri is a practicing internist at Bellevue Hospital and the editor-in-chief of the Bellevue Literary Review. She is also the author of Singular Intimacies: Becoming a Doctor at Bellevue.
