= Hall Farm (Clunette, Indiana) =

- U.S. National Register of Historic Places
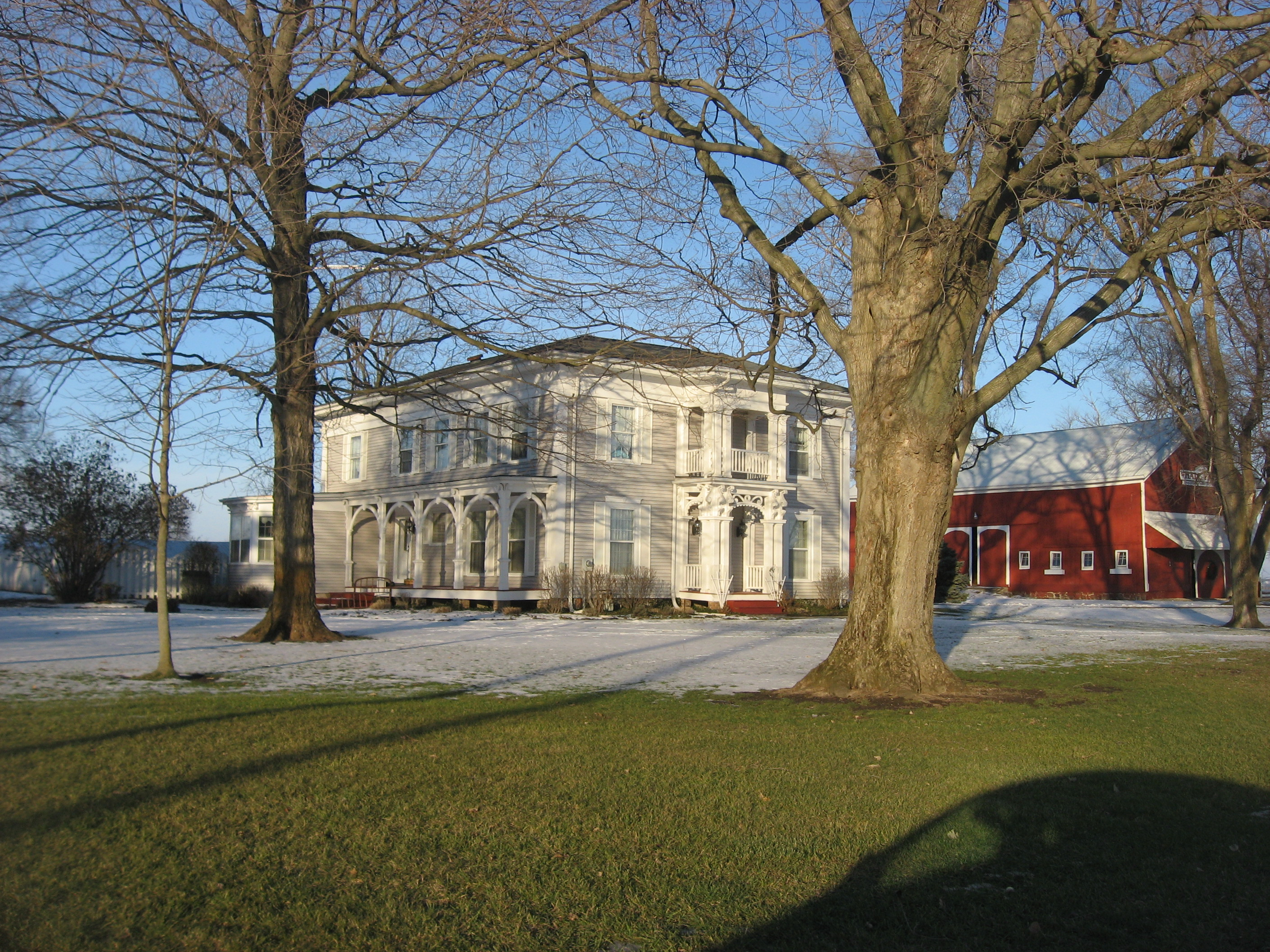
- Hall Farm at Clunette, January 2013

- Location within Indiana Location within the United States
- Location: Jct. of 600 N and 400 W at Clunette, Indiana
- Coordinates: 41°19′12″N 85°55′11″W
- Area: 3.9 acres (1.6 ha)
- Built: 1871
- Architectural style: Italianate, English Barn
- NRHP reference No.: 92001164
- Added to NRHP: September 16, 1992

Hall Farm is a historic home and farm located in Prairie Township, Kosciusko County, Indiana. The house was built in 1871, and is a two-story, three-bay, Italianate style frame dwelling. It is topped by a low pitched hipped roof. The front facade features a two-story, one-bay portico with elaborate brackets and scrollwork. Also on the property is a contributing timber frame English barn (c. 1871).

It was listed on the National Register of Historic Places in 1992.
