= Bellevue Literary Review =

- Discipline: literary magazine
- Language: English
- Edited by: Danielle Ofri

Publication details
- History: 2001–present
- Frequency: Biannual

Standard abbreviations
- ISO 4: Bellevue Lit. Rev.

Indexing
- ISSN: 1537-5048

Links
- Journal homepage

Bellevue Literary Review is an independent literary magazine that publishes fiction, nonfiction and poetry about the human body, illness, health and healing. It was co-founded in 2000 by Danielle Ofri (Bellevue Hospital) who still serves as editor-in-chief, and Martin Blaser (NYU School of Medicine). The magazine became independent in 2020 and received a prestigious Whiting Award the following year. It has been called "one of the premiere literary journals founded in the medical field."

Selections from the magazine have been reprinted in the Pushcart Prize anthology, and have appeared on the notable lists of The Best American Essays, Best American Travel Writing, and The Best American Nonrequired Reading.

The magazine hosts an annual writing competition every spring, publishes a special theme issue every fall, and produces both in-person and online events. It also offers free study guides and reading group guides on its website.

The imprint Bellevue Literary Press was founded in 2007 through donations by nonfiction editor Jerome Lowenstein.

== See also ==
- List of literary magazines
