= Danielle Ofri =

American writer and physician

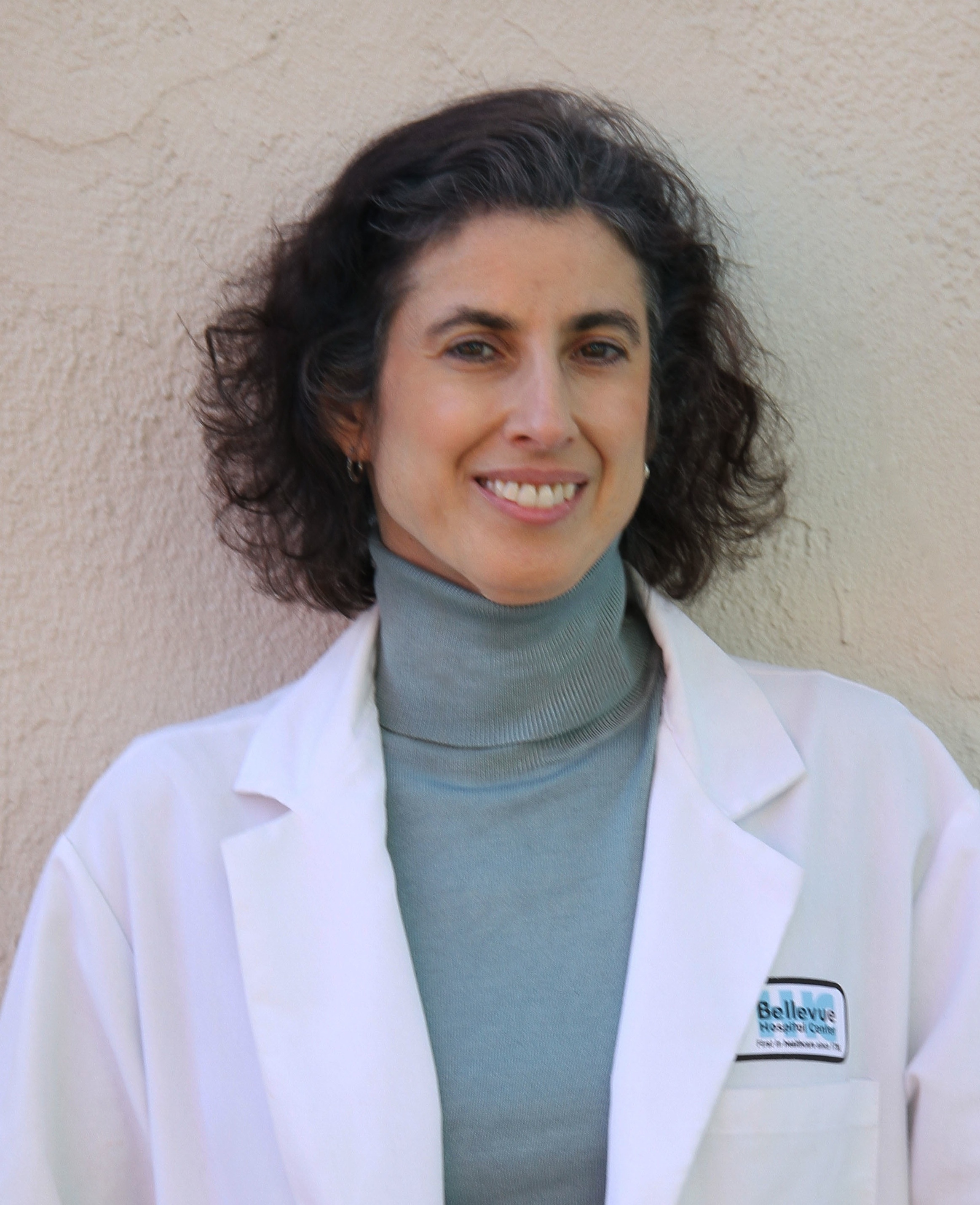
Danielle Ofri

Danielle Ofri is an American essayist, editor, and practicing internist. She is an attending physician at Bellevue Hospital, and a clinical professor of medicine at the New York University School of Medicine. Her writing appears in The New Yorker, The New York Times, and The Lancet.

== Early life ==
Ofri was born in New York City. She received an undergraduate degree in physiology from McGill University. She graduated from the New York University School of Medicine with an M.D. and a Ph.D. in pharmacology. Her doctorate was on the biochemistry of opioid receptors in the laboratory of Dr. Eric Simon. She trained in internal medicine at Bellevue Hospital.

== Writing and editing career ==
After completing her medical residency, Ofri began writing about her medical training at Bellevue Hospital, the oldest public hospital and one of the busiest urban hospitals in the country. These essays were published in literary journals and eventually formed the basis of her first book, Singular Intimacies: Becoming a Doctor at Bellevue.

Ofri returned to Bellevue Hospital as an attending physician, where she continues to teach and practice medicine. In 2000, Ofri co-founded the Bellevue Literary Review, the first literary magazine to arise from a hospital. It is considered the preeminent journal in its field and received a prestigious Whiting Award. BLR is now an independent literary nonprofit organization. Ofri remains editor-in-chief of BLR..

Ofri's writings have been included in Best American Essays 2002 and 2005, and Best American Science Writing 2003. Her essays and reviews have appeared in The New York Times, The New England Journal of Medicine, The Lancet, the Los Angeles Times, and on National Public Radio. She is the recipient of the McGovern award from the American Medical Writers Association for her contributions to medical literature. She received an honorary doctorate of humane letters from Curry College. She writes regularly for The New York Times health section about medicine and the doctor-patient connection.

== Books ==
Ofri's first book, Singular Intimacies: Becoming a Doctor at Bellevue, was published in 2001. The book traces her experiences in medical school and residency at an inner-city hospital. An essay from the book, "Merced", was chosen by Stephen Jay Gould for Best American Essays 2002, and was awarded the Editor's Prize for Nonfiction by The Missouri Review.

Her second book, Incidental Findings: Lessons from my Patients in the Art of Medicine, was published in 2005. It explores the subject of teaching medicine to the next generation of physicians, as well as Ofri’s experiences as a "locum tenens" physician in small town America. Ofri also writes about her own experience being a patient. The essay "Living Will" was selected by Susan Orlean for Best American Essays 2005. The essay "Common Ground" was selected by Oliver Sacks for Best American Science Writing 2003 and granted an honorable mention by Anne Fadiman in Best American Essays 2004.

Ofri released her third book, Medicine in Translation: Journeys with My Patients, in 2010. It discusses immigration and health care—two topics that dominated the public discourse in 2010. Ofri explores the cultural challenges in medicine, and chronicles the experiences of immigrants and Americans in the U.S. health care system.

Her fourth book, What Doctors Feel: How Emotions Affect the Practice of Medicine, was published in 2013. This book examines the emotional side of medicine that impacts patient care. Ofri's fifth book, What Patients Say, What Doctors Hear, was published in 2017 and explores the doctor-patient conversation as the most powerful tool in medicine. Her sixth book, When We Do Harm; A Doctor Confronts Medical Error, was published in 2020 and examines the challenges of making medical care safer for patients.

== Other awards and recognition ==
- Guggenheim Fellow
- Davies Award from the American College of Physicians
- Gold Foundation Medical Humanism Award
- Master of the American College of Physicians.
- McGovern award by the American Medical Writers Association for "preeminent contributions to medical communication."
- Honorary Doctorate of Humane Letters from Curry College
- Editor's Prize for Nonfiction by The Missouri Review.

== Personal life ==
Ofri lives in New York City, and has three children. She studies cello.

== Publications ==
- Ofri, Danielle (2003-04-15). Singular Intimacies: Becoming a Doctor at Bellevue. Beacon Press. ISBN 978-0-8070-7252-3.
- Ofri, Danielle (2005-12-15). "Gifts of the Magi; For a young doctor far from home, an unexpected present from a homeless alcoholic". New York Times.
- Ofri, Danielle (2005-04-28). "They Sent Me Here". The New England Journal of Medicine. 352 (17): 1746–1748. doi:10.1056/NEJMp038252. PMID 15858183.
- Ofri, Danielle (2006). "The Practice of Medicine: Neither Science nor Art". The Lancet. 367 (9513): 807–808. doi:10.1016/S0140-6736(06)68320-7. S2CID 54370801.
- Ofri, Danielle (April 2006). Incidental Findings: Lessons from My Patients in the Art of Medicine. Beacon Press. ISBN 978-0-8070-7267-7.
- Ofri, Danielle (2010). Medicine in Translation: Journeys with My Patients. Beacon Press. ISBN 978-0-8070-7320-9.
- Ofri, Danielle (2005). "Living Well". Best American Essays. 2005: 139–150.
- Ofri, Danielle (2002). "Merced". Best American Essays. 2002: 237–252.
- Ofri, Danielle (2003). "Common Ground". Best American Science Writing. Vol. 2003. HarperCollins Publisher. pp. 213–221.
