= Atwood, Indiana =

- Unincorporated community
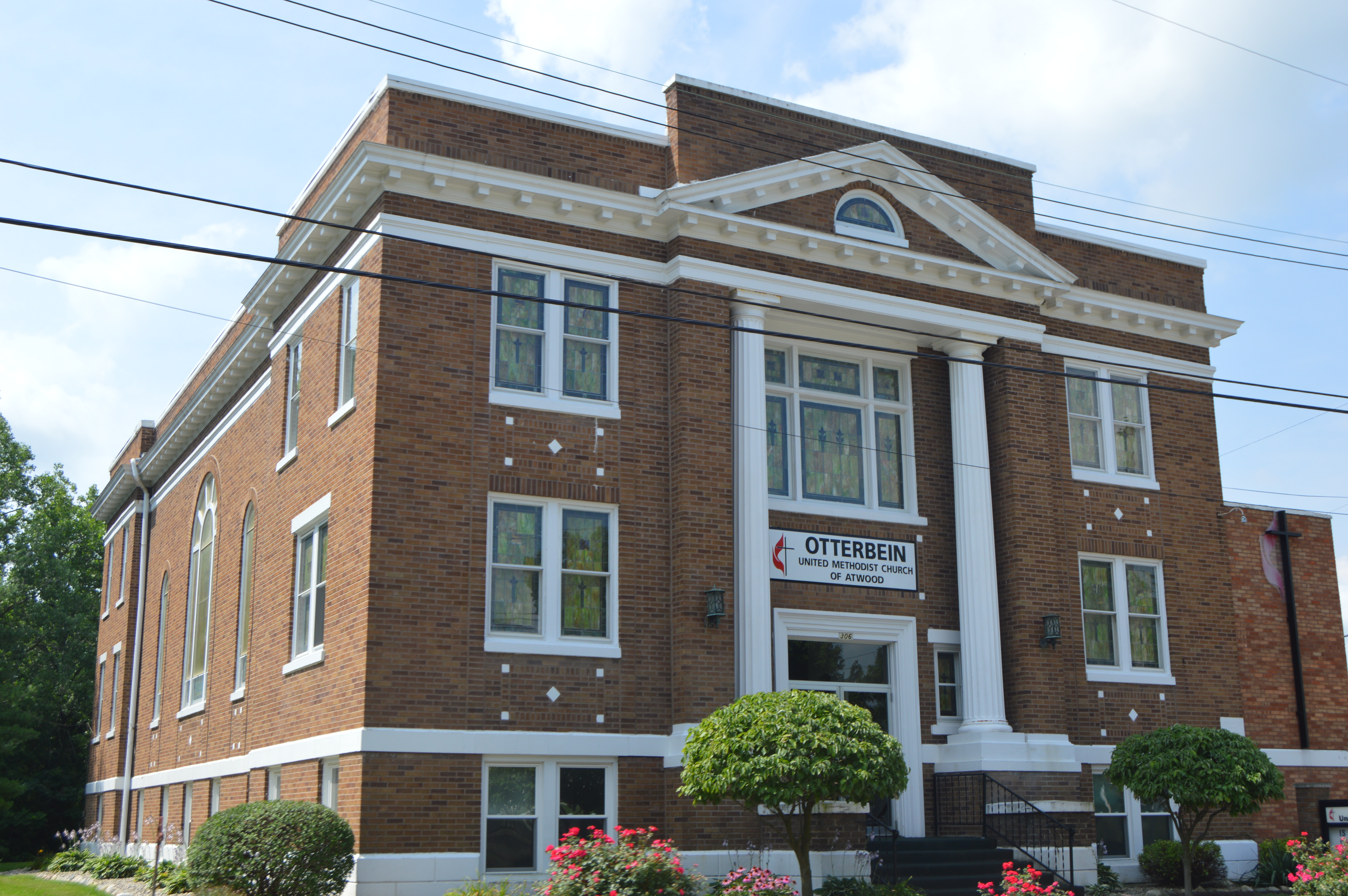
- Methodist church

- Location within Indiana Location within the United States
- Coordinates: 41°15′39″N 85°58′31″W
- Country: United States
- State: Indiana
- County: Kosciusko
- Township: Prairie
- Elevation: 824 ft (251 m)
- Time zone: UTC-5 (Eastern (EST))
  - Summer (DST): UTC-4 (EDT)
- ZIP code: 46502
- FIPS code: 18-02638
- GNIS feature ID: 430332

Atwood is an unincorporated community in Prairie Township, and Harrison Township, Kosciusko County, in the U.S. state of Indiana.

== History ==
Originally named "Mount Ruska," Atwood was laid out as a village by Harvey Hunt and Agnes Teegarden on September 29, 1857. It was situated at an important trading point due to the Pittsburgh, Fort Wayne, and Chicago Railway passing through the area in 1856. A post office was established in 1864. By a petition of the citizens in 1865, the town's name was officially changed to Atwood. The petition cited the fact that the location had come to be known and designated on railroad maps as "Atwood Station." After the name change, the community expanded in geographic size with the inclusions from 1866 to 1868 of Longyear's, Williamson's, Green's, and Wray's additions to the original village plat.

The first church building in Atwood was constructed by Methodist volunteers in 1868, using donated lumber from the wooded area south of town known as “Carpenter’s Woods.” The land upon which the church was built first belonged to Ira Atwood, an early area landowner. The first school building was erected in 1878. As the community developed, businesses began to crop up and thrive along the village's Main Street, which served as a connection to the county seat of Warsaw. “Then Atwood had its little season of hopes,” wrote Judge Lemuel Royse in his 1919 history of Kosciusko County, but “with small fruition; for it was too near Warsaw to control any considerable territory.”

Despite its small size, for years the community had a respectable business base, supporting grocery stores, hardwares, restaurants, factories, mills, and other small business operations. The Lincoln Highway was built and passed through the heart of the town in 1927, bringing many new travelers and economic opportunities. The modern, four-lane U.S. 30 was constructed north of town in 1972, however, syphoning traffic and business away from the area.

Concerned citizens established a volunteer fire department in 1946, and it remains in operation today. Though the community never incorporated to become a municipality, it has a community building, owned and operated by a nonprofit board of private citizens, and streetlights throughout the town, which have been maintained and funded by the Atwood Lions Club since 1960.

== Geography ==
Atwood is situated along the border between Prairie and Harrison Townships in Kosciusko County, with the northern portion of the town lying in Prairie and the southern portion in Harrison. The community is southeast of Hoffman Lake, northeast of Crystal Lake, and north of the nearby Tippecanoe River.

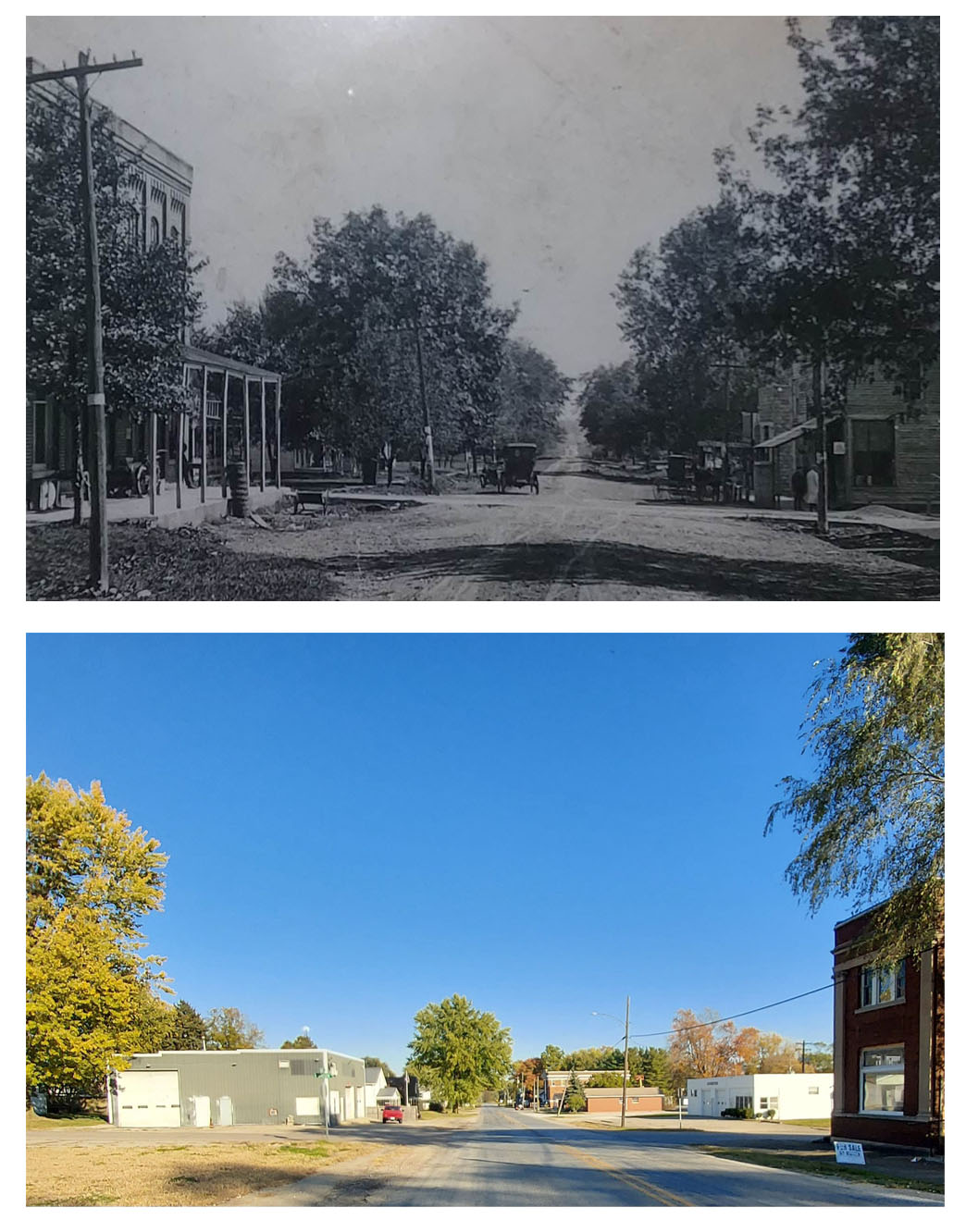
A view looking east on Main Street in Atwood in 1909 and 2024

== Schools ==
The Atwood High School was constructed in 1909. The school mascot was a Greyhound. The Atwood boys' basketball team won a regional championship in the1921-1922 season. A gymnasium was added to the school building in 1949. Prior to that, the basketball team played its home games in a separate building across town or in the gym of neighboring Etna Green. The high school shut down in 1962, but the building continued to house the Atwood Elementary School until its closure in 2005. Today the building serves as a church. Those who had attended the Atwood school now attend Warsaw Community High School.

== Notable people ==
- Harold Achor; Justice of the Indiana Supreme Court
- Emery Andrew Rovenstine; renowned anesthesiologist
