= Emanuel Papper =

American anesthesiologist, professor, and author

Emanuel Martin Papper
- Born: July 12, 1915; New York City, U.S.
- Died: December 3, 2002 (aged 87); Miami, Florida, U.S.
- Education: Columbia University (BA); New York University (MD); University of Miami (PhD)
- Medical career
- Profession: Physician
- Sub-specialties: Anesthesiology

Emanuel Martin Papper (July 12, 1915 – December 3, 2002) was an American anesthesiologist, professor, and author.

== Early life ==
Papper was born in a Harlem tenement on July 12, 1915, the son of two immigrants. He attended Boys High School in Brooklyn and graduated in 1931. From there he moved on to Columbia College, where, with the help of a scholarship, he obtained his AB degree, Phi Beta Kappa, in 1935. Following college, Papper obtained a medical degree from New York University in 1938.

== Medical career ==
After medical school, Papper was appointed a fellow in medicine at New York University. In 1939, he had an internship at Bellevue Hospital, which included a one-month rotation at that institution's Department of Anesthesiology, headed by Emery Rovenstine. This short exposure prompted Papper to research the discipline further. Following his internship, he took an NYU Fellowship under Homer W. Smith, before returning to Bellevue for a residency under Rovenstine from 1940 to 1942.

World War II temporarily disrupted Papper's career trajectory. He served as a major in the Army Medical Corps from 1942 through 1946. He served as chief of the Section on Anesthesiology at Torney General Hospital in Palm Springs and Dibble General Hospital in Menlo Park before being sent to the European theater. Upon his return home, he served as chief of Anesthesiology and Operating Rooms at Walter Reed. For his service, he was awarded the Army Commendation Medal.

At the end of his service, he returned to Bellevue as the first assistant director at Bellevue Hospital.

== Later life ==
In 1949, Papper accepted a position at the College of Physicians and Surgeons of Columbia University, where he served as professor and director of anesthesiology. He remained at Columbia until 1969, establishing an independent Department of Anesthesiology there, just as Rovenstine had at New York. At the time, it was only the fourth such department in the country, and Papper was the youngest ever director.

Papper was appointed dean in 1969 of the University of Miami School of Medicine and vice president for Medical Affairs, which he held until 1981. After his retirement as dean, he enrolled in the English PhD program at the university, obtaining his new degree in 1990. His work for the program led to the publication of his book Romance, Poetry, and Surgical Sleep: Literature Influences Medicine.

== Books ==
- Romance, Poetry, and Surgical Sleep: Literature Influences Medicine ISBN 978-0313294051

== See also ==
- List of Columbia University alumni and attendees
