= Singular Intimacies =

Collection of essays by Danielle Ofri

Singular Intimacies: Becoming a Doctor at Bellevue is a collection of essays by physician-writer Danielle Ofri, detailing the experience of medical training in America’s oldest public hospital. Ofri writes about being an untested medical student, pitched from academia into Bellevue Hospital, eventually making it to the other side as a doctor.

The essay Merced was chosen by Stephen Jay Gould for his book Best American Essays 2002, and was also awarded the Editor's Prize for Nonfiction by The Missouri Review.

Ofri is a practicing internist at Bellevue Hospital and the editor-in-chief of the Bellevue Literary Review. She is also the author of Incidental Findings: Lessons from my Patients in the Art of Medicine.
