= Gertie F. Marx =

Obstetric anesthesiologist

Gertie Florentine Marx
- Born: 13 February 1912; Frankfurt, German Empire
- Died: 25 January 2004 (aged 92); The Bronx, New York City
- Education: University of Frankfurt; University of Bern (M.D.)
- Occupation: Anesthesiologist
- Years active: 1939-1995
- Known for: 'The mother of obstetric anaesthesia'
- Medical career
- Profession: Physician
- Field: Anesthesiology
- Institutions: Beth Israel Hospital; Albert Einstein College of Medicine
- Sub-specialties: Obstetric anesthesiology

Gertie Florentine Marx (1912–2004) was an obstetric anesthesiologist, "internationally known as 'the mother of obstetric anaesthesia'". Marx pioneered the use of epidural analgesia during childbirth, and was the founding editor of the quarterly Obstetric Anesthesia Digest.

== Life ==
Gertie Marx was born in Frankfurt on February 13, 1912, and attended medical school at the University of Frankfurt from 1931. A Jew, she emigrated to Switzerland in 1936 and completed her medical studies at the University of Bern, graduating in 1937. Later that year she travelled on to the United States and settled in New York City. In 1939 she secured an internship at Beth Israel Hospital, and in 1940 became the first resident in a new anesthesiology residency program at the hospital. In 1943 she joined the attending staff at Beth Israel Medical Center. In 1955 she moved to the Albert Einstein College of Medicine, and remained there until retirement as Emeritus Professor in 1995.

== Honors and awards ==
Marx received numerous recognitions for her role in anesthesiology. In 1988, Marx became the second woman to receive the Distinguished Service Award from the American Society of Anesthesiologists. The American Society for Regional Anesthesia also presented Gertie with a Distinguished Service Award (DSA) in 1990. Marx was awarded the College Medal by the Royal College of Anaesthetists in a 1993 ceremony in London presented by Queen Elizabeth II.

== Bibliography ==
As well as the books listed below, Marx authored over 150 articles and many textbook chapters.

- Gertie F. Marx (1979). Clinical Management of Mother and Newborn. Springer-Verlag.
- Gertie F. Marx (1978). Anesthetic considerations in hypertensive disorders of pregnancy. Year Book Medical Publishers.
- Gertie F. Marx (1973). Parturition and perinatology. F.A. Davis Co.
- Gertie F. Marx; Louis R. Orkin (1969). Physiology of obstetric anesthesia. C.C. Thomas.
