= Clunette, Indiana =

- Unincorporated community
- Location within Indiana Location within the United States
- Coordinates: 41°19′11″N 85°55′22″W
- Country: United States
- State: Indiana
- County: Kosciusko
- Township: Prairie
- Elevation: 856 ft (261 m)
- Time zone: UTC-5 (Eastern (EST))
  - Summer (DST): UTC-4 (EDT)
- ZIP code: 46582
- GNIS feature ID: 432694

Clunette is an unincorporated community located in Prairie Township, Kosciusko County, in the U.S. state of Indiana. The Hall Farm (Clunette, Indiana) and the Clunette Elevator are both located in Clunette. The Clunette Cemetery is just outside the community, and the Clunette United Methodist Church is located in nearby Leesburg, Indiana.

== History ==
Clunette was originally called Galveston, and under the latter name was laid out in 1846. A post office was established as Clunette in 1883, and remained in operation until it was discontinued in 1901.

== Clunette Cemetery ==
The Clunette Cemetery is located 1/2 mile north and 1/4 mile west of Clunette on a lane leading west from County Road 400 West. It includes burials from before 1800. The cemetery is no longer in use.

== Clunette Elevator ==
As of 2013 the Clunette Elevator has been family owned and operated for 62 years.
