= Pennsylvania Anatomy Act of 1883 =

Legislation to facilitate medical education

The Pennsylvania Anatomy Act of 1883 is legislation of the State of Pennsylvania to facilitate medical education. This act allowed teachers and students to be able to dissect bodies without have to resort to buying from grave robbers or buying body parts. This act was written to prevent grave robbing, and to even out the availability of corpses.

== Background ==
Prior to the Pennsylvania Anatomy Act being passed in 1883, many other dissection acts were passed in America. These acts included the Massachusetts Act of 1784, which stated that those that died or were executed due to dueling may be dissected. The next act was an act in New York called An Act to Prevent the Odious Practice of Digging up and Removing, for the Purpose of Dissection, Dead Bodies Interred in Cemeteries or Burial Places. This act was one of the first acts in America to prevent grave robbing for dissection, the first section says that anyone convicted of removing a dead body for the purpose of dissection, intending to dissect, dissecting or assisting with the dissection shall suffer consequences. So that learning about anatomy using dissection is not harmed when someone is convicted of murder, arson, or burglary they are then either sentenced to death, and the judges may decide that the offender's body be used for dissection or their body is buried. Then in 1831 Massachusetts passed an act saying that the bodies of the unclaimed deceased be delivered to the anatomists, under certain restrictions. In 1835 Missouri allowed executed slaves along with convicted criminal's bodies to be dissected. The 1854 Bone Bill in New York allowed the unclaimed bodies of criminals or the homeless to be sent to medical schools.

In 1867 the city of Philadelphia, Pennsylvania and the county of Allegheny in Pennsylvania, passed an act, that gave each medical school, in the public and private sectors, within Philadelphia and Allegheny county Pennsylvania the same amount of unclaimed bodies per student. Therefore, a larger medical school would get more bodies than a small school of 20 students, such as if a school were to have 200 medical students they would get 50 bodies, but if a school were to have 25 medical students they would receive 12–13 bodies. If a person claimed that they wanted to be buried prior to death, then their body would not be allowed to be given to these medical schools, they would instead be buried despite being unclaimed. Another part of this act punished the anatomists if they were caught selling the spare bodies or spare body parts, the same punishment applied for the grave robbers and someone caught buying the spare bodies or spare body parts. This act later on was made into seven sections and would include all of the counties of Pennsylvania, instead of one county and a major city, and would become what we know today as the Pennsylvania Anatomy Act of 1883.

== Provisions of the act ==
The act stated that all bodies used for medical advancements must be obtained in a legal manner, through the state, so as to prevent the unethical obtaining of corpses. The act also allowed for the use of unclaimed bodies for medical research.

Section One of the act specified the creation of a board of scholars that would be tasked with the delivery of corpses. This board of scholars would be made up of no less than 25 scholars elected by each of the dentistry, surgery, and medical schools within the Pennsylvania Commonwealth. The board would be tasked with the record keeping of each corpse delivered, and who the corpse was delivered to.

Specifications for the distribution of corpses were put into place by Section Three of the act. Bodies would first be delivered to schools in need of bodies for demonstrations and lectures. Bodies remaining after the initial need was met were to be allotted based on the number of students in each class.

Section Five of the bill stated that the distribution of corpses illegally over Commonwealth boundaries would be considered body trafficking. It was further specified that such trafficking would be charged as a misdemeanor offense, resulting in up to a 200 dollar fine or a one-year sentence in prison.

Members of the board who do not perform their duties as required will be subject to up to a 500 dollar fine, as specified by Section Seven of the act.

== Passage of the bill ==
The initial act was accepted by the House of Representatives, but opposed in the senate by one senator who claimed that the act was, "unworthy of the age in which [they] live". This opposition caused the act to be rewritten and re-submitted for consideration. The act was then rewritten, and it was passed in both the House and Senate in the year 1883.

== Extent and effect ==
- In 1879, a version of this act was enacted into Indiana and Ohio law, stemming from a corpse that was acquired under false pretenses and used at the Ohio Medical College. This body was John Scott Harrison, a late United States Congressman and son of President William Henry Harrison.
- By 1881, a survey disclosed that 15 of 38 states had "liberal" anatomy acts, nine of them had "illiberal" anatomy acts, and 14 states had none.
- By 1913, there were 39 states with medical schools, like Alabama, that still lacked Anatomy acts.
- January 1, 1889. In order to carry the Pennsylvania Anatomy Act of 1883 into execution, the attention of all state, county, and municipal officers charged with duties under the law were directed towards fulfilling its requirements. The coffins containing bodies should be sent to George Willie, of Philadelphia. The coffins should be delivered to the agent of the express company at the train station nearest to the location where the body is to be sent. The transportation charges were sent to the railroad station, and were to be paid by the agent of the express company, and collected from the board of scholars by the agent in Philadelphia.
- Based on research from the American Association for the Advancement of Science, the Anatomy committee's opinion was that the law of the State of Pennsylvania was the best created for anatomy acts. It was designed in good frame to be able to provide necessary anatomical material for the promotion of Medical Science under strict execution. The act also protected the buried bodies safety.

== Bibliography ==
- Harris, D. Fraser (March 1920). "History of the Events which led to the Passing of the British Anatomy Act, A.D. 1832". Canadian Medical Association Journal. 10 (3): 283–284. PMC 1523813. PMID 20312245.
- Forbes, W. S. History of the Anatomy Act of Pennsylvania. Philadelphia: The Philadelphia Medical Publishing Company, 1898. PDF. <http://jdc.jefferson.edu/anatomy_act_of_penn/1/>.
- Scovil, Lindsay. "A Market for Death." A-market-for-death. Lindsay Scovil, 2015. Web. 23 Oct. 2016. <http://www.marketfordeath.com/timelineofanatomyacts>.
- "Passage of an Anatomy Act in Pennsylvania.: An Act for the Promotion of Medical Science, and to Prevent the Traffic in Human Bodies." Chicago Medical Examiner (1860-1871) 8.5 (1867): 300-02.American Periodicals Series Online [ProQuest]. Web. 24 Oct. 2016.
