= Bone Bill =

New York bill about cadavers (1854)

New York State Legislature
- Long title: An Act to Promote Medical Science and Protect Burial Grounds
- Passed: April 3, 1854
- Introduced by: John William Draper

"An Act to Promote Medical Science and Protect Burial Grounds", informally known as the Bone Bill, was an 1854 bill in New York. Its purpose was to greatly increase the number of cadavers available for legal dissection in medical schools.

== History ==
The bill was proposed by John William Draper, co-founder and president of what is now the New York University School of Medicine. He noted a significant deficit in the number of cadavers available for dissection by medical students in his classes. Under previous state law, only executed criminals could be used. Draper proposed that "all vagrants dying, unclaimed, and without friends, are to be given to the institutions in which medicine and surgery are taught for dissection". A grace period of 24 hours before donation would allow families to claim those whom they wished to bury.

Proponents of the bill argued that it ensured that criminals and the poor "will make some returns to those whom they have burdened by their wants, or injured by their crimes", and would further prevent body snatching. Protests against the bill took place in poorer areas of the city, and an anti-bill banner was included in the New York City St. Patrick's Day parade.

The bill saw extensive debate in the legislature and in the media of the time. It was eventually passed by a single vote and made law on 3 April 1854. Outcomes of the bill were mixed: it succeeded in making more cadavers available for dissection and incidence of body snatching did decline, but enforcement was uneven and "commerce in bodies" as well as "anatomy scandals" continued for the next several decades.

== See also ==
- Anatomy Act 1832
- Pennsylvania Anatomy Act of 1883
