= Benjamin Fordyce Barker =

American physician

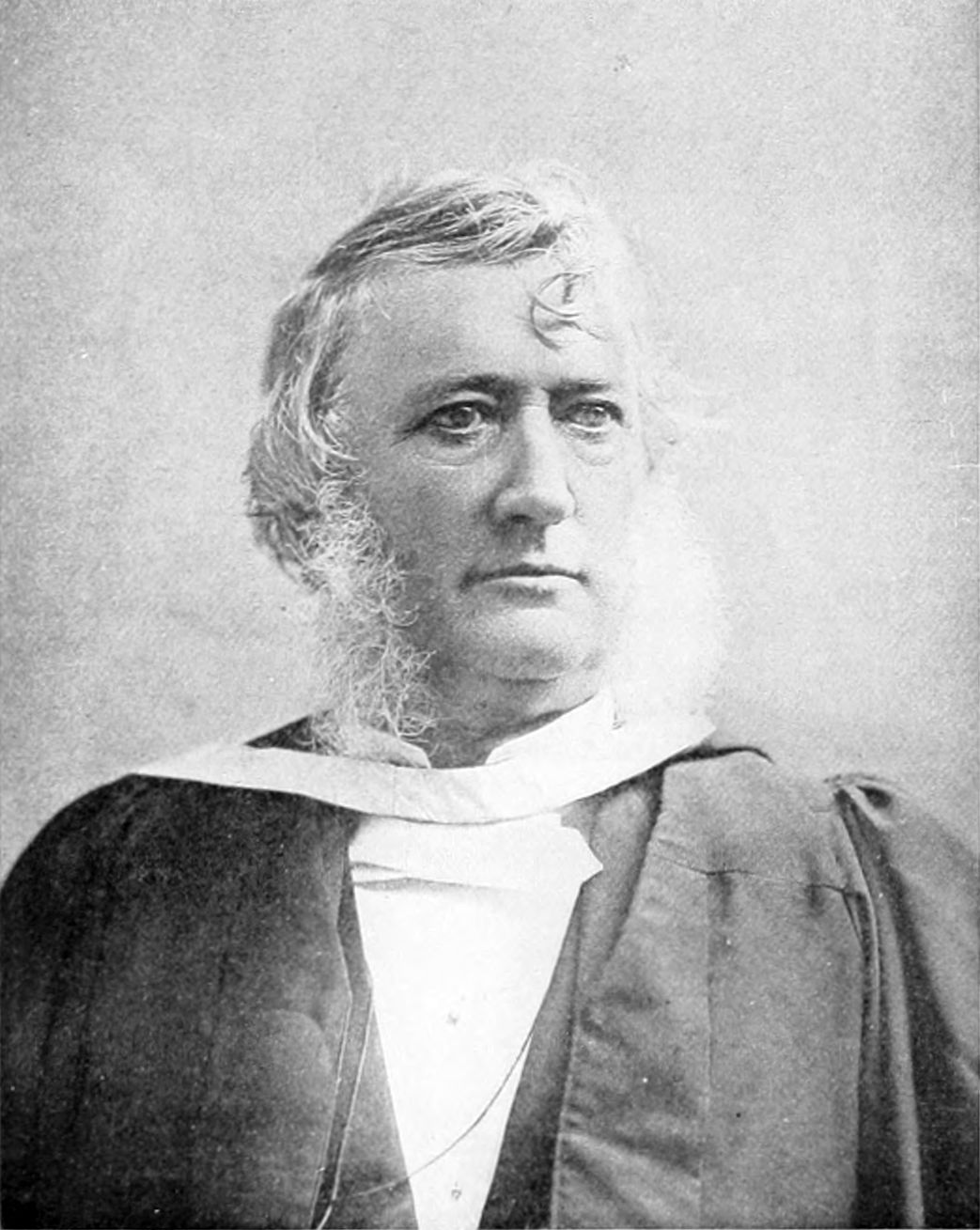
- Born: May 2, 1818; Wilton, Maine
- Died: May 30, 1891 (aged 73); New York, New York
- Education: Bowdoin College
- Occupation: Physician
- Spouse: Elizabeth E. Dwight (m. 1843)

Benjamin Fordyce Barker (1818–1891), generally known as Fordyce Baker, was an obstetrician from Maine who was a visiting physician at Bellevue Hospital from 1855 to 1879 and a consulting physician there from 1879 to his death.

== Life ==
He was born at Wilton, Maine, May 2, 1818, the son of Doctor John Barker and Phebe Abbott. His father, a practitioner at Wilton, was formerly for two years an army surgeon in the War of 1812. Fordyce's early education was under the tutelage of his parents until eleven years of age, then began his classical training under his uncle John Abbott, at China, Maine. From thence he went to Farmington, Maine, to attend the school of Professor Green; next he went to Limerick, Maine, to complete his preparation for college; this he did under the guidance of his uncle by marriage, the Reverend Charles Freeman. He entered Bowdoin College in 1833, graduating with the degree of A. B. in 1837; he then entered the Medical Department in the same University and was graduated with the degree of M. D. in 1841, previously having received an A. M. in 1840.

Owing to signs of incipient tuberculosis he left Maine, riding on horseback to Norwich, Connecticut, where he finally settled. On September 14, 1843, he was married to Miss Elizabeth E. Dwight of Harrisburg, Pennsylvania. He spent the winter of 1844 and 1845 in Paris, graduating there in 1845 and returning to Norwich the same year, taking the position of lecturer on obstetrics at Bowdoin in 1845 and 1846. In May, 1848, he delivered the annual address before the Connecticut State Medical Society. He moved to New York in March, 1850, to take part in the organization of the New York Medical College, to which he became professor of obstetrics and diseases of women and children. In 1856 he to make annual summer trips to Europe, which, with a single exception, were repeated up to the time of his death. In 1860 he became president of the New York State Medical Society. It was about this time that Bellevue Medical College, New York City, was founded, Dr. Barker becoming one of a faculty which was brought together there at that time. First he was professor of obstetrics, then professor of clinical midwifery and diseases of children, then professor emeritus. His associates in the field of obstetrics and allied subjects were Isaac E. Taylor and George T. Elliot. He was very active in promoting the union of the library of the Medical Journal Association and that of the New York Academy of Medicine. He was president of the Academy of Medicine from 1879 to 1885, and he was president of the American Gynecological Society in 1876 and 1877. Columbia College gave him the degree of LL. D. in 1878, Edinburgh in 1884, also Glasgow in 1888, and Bowdoin in 1887.

He was president of the New York Obstetrical Society and vice-president of the International Medical Congress, London, 1888. He was attending obstetrician at Bellevue Hospital from 1855 to 1879, afterward consulting obstetrician from the latter date to his death in 1891, also attending and then consulting surgeon at the New York State Woman's Hospital.

He was trained in the Congregational Church but died an Episcopalian. He had one son, Fordyce Barker, a banker, who survived him but a few years.

He died at his home in New York City, May 30, 1891, of cerebral hemorrhage, his wife surviving him.

== Works ==
He contributed many written essays on the subject of his special work. (See list by Doctor W. T. Lusk, "Transactions of New York Academy of Medicine," 1891, Second Series, volume viii, page 300. See also Index Catalogue, Washington, D. C., 1897, second series, volume ii). In 1856 he was instrumental in introducing the hypodermic syringe into America.

His principal work was his book Puerperal Diseases, Clinical Lectures delivered at Bellevue Hospital, New York, 1874. It was translated into German, Italian, French, Spanish and Russian.

== Memberships ==
His contact with social life is attested by his club memberships such as the University, the Century and the Union, all of New York City. His interest in the wider activities of his day, are indicated in his membership in the following societies:— Physicians' Mutual Aid Association, 1868; Fellow London Medical Society, 1878; Member London and Edinburgh Obstetrical Societies; Corresponding Member Philadelphia Obstetrical Society, 1874; Royal Society of Greece; president of the Anglo-American Society of Paris for October, 1890 (unable to be present); American Gynecological Society, 1876–77; vice-president International Medical Congress at London, 1881; visiting physician Bellevue Hospital, 1855–79; consulting physician, 1879–91; member of the Century Association (N. Y.) 1851; New York Academy of Design, 1864; American Geographic and Statistical Society, 1850; life member American Bible Society, 1867; St. John's Guild, 1871; life member, Museum of Natural History; member of Church Temperance Society and Charity Organization Society.
