= Obstetric anesthesiology =

Sub-specialty of anesthesiology

Obstetric anesthesia or obstetric anesthesiology, also known as ob-gyn anesthesia or ob-gyn anesthesiology, is a sub-specialty of anesthesiology that provides peripartum (time directly preceding, during or following childbirth) pain relief (analgesia) for labor and anesthesia (suppress consciousness) for cesarean deliveries ('C-sections').

Other subspecialty options for anesthesiology include cardiac anesthesiology, pediatric anesthesiology, pain medicine, critical care, neuroanesthesia, regional anesthesia, transplant anesthesia and trauma anesthesia.

== Scope ==
Obstetric anesthesiologists typically serve as consultants to ob-gyn physicians and provide pain management for both complicated and uncomplicated pregnancies. An obstetric anesthesiologist's practice may consist largely of managing pain during vaginal deliveries and administering anesthesia for cesarean sections; however, the scope is expanding to involve anesthesia for both maternal as well as fetal procedures.

Maternal-specific procedures include cerclage, external cephalic version (ECV), postpartum bilateral tubal ligation (BTL), and dilation and evacuation (D and E). Fetus-specific procedures include fetoscopic laser photocoagulation and ex-utero intrapartum treatment (EXIT). However, the majority of care given by anesthesiologists on most labor and delivery units is management of labor analgesia and anesthesia for cesarean section.

== History ==
The administration of general anesthesia in operative procedures was publicly demonstrated by William Thomas Green Morton (1819–1868) in Boston, October 1846 as the first successful practice of its kind. This practice revealed the pain-annulling properties of ether inhalation during surgery. Pioneers of obstetric anesthesia extended these findings to cases of parturition or childbirth, notably including James Young Simpson of Scotland (1811–1870), John Snow of London (1813–1858) and Walter Channing of the United States (1786–1876).

Prior to the anesthetizing of Queen Victoria in 1853, the use of diethyl ether and chloroform as obstetric anesthetics faced social, religious, and medical opposition. With the shift in social attitudes, women became less reserved towards this novel practice and began coercing physicians to administer powerful anesthetics during labor. Medical objections were similarly disintegrated with casebook publications that reflected the safety of obstetric anesthesia for both mother and child. Thus the advent of obstetric anesthesia facilitated the use of instruments during delivery as obstetricians were afforded greater scope in terms of these materials.

Following Morton's use of ether as an anesthetic, James Simpson conducted his own obstetric anesthetic trial on January 19, 1847 using an open-drop approach to administer ether. However, due to its post-analgesic effect of nausea and vomiting, he later switched to using chloroform instead. Simpson's later personal discovery of chloroform's anesthetic properties inspired subsequent trials with chloroform that he went on to make public in November 1847. The Medico Surgical Society publication of Simpson's findings was not well received and required significant defense thereafter. Three months later, on April 7, 1847, ether was used for the first time in American obstetrics. Following that initial administration documented in the Boston Medical and Surgical Journal by N.C Keep, Walter Channing described several obstetric cases in which he successfully employed sulfuric ether in the United States.

John Snow was responsible for anesthetizing the Queen and is also attributed for influencing public and medical opinions on obstetric anesthesia through his various recorded experiences Though the birth of the Queen's 8th child Prince Leopold on April 7, 1853, was not generally publicized, the London social elite were aware of the use of chloroform in this delivery and found it appealing. Until this time, there had been considerable public and religious opposition to obstetric anesthesia. A woman, Eufame MacAlayne, was buried alive in Scotland in 1591 just for seeking pain relief for the birth of her two sons. This societal aspect of childbirth was recognized by Dr. Churchill of Dublin and later published on the statistics of obstetric anesthesia. Churchill suggested wealthier individuals were recorded to have easier births from the use of such drugs. In the practice of obstetric anesthesia, John Snow greatly differed from Simpson in that Snow emphasized proper quantity measurements and the delay of administration until the second stage of labor commenced. Snow additionally disagreed with Simpson's argument that the laboring patient should be anesthetized to the level of unconsciousness. These differences among others are why the title "Father of Obstetric Anesthesia" has become so controversial.

=== Religious opposition ===
Labor analgesia was debated on the grounds of religion and morality, which John Simpson used as his own weapon against opposition. Biblical literalism led many to interpret labor pains as punishment for sin and deemed obstetric anesthesia impious with respect to the primeval curse. Simpson advocated that "whosoever shall keep the whole law and yet offend in one point, is guilty of all". In this sentiment he is referring to many of the medical practitioners who mitigate minor pains but avoid obstetric anesthetics for fear of opposition or religious persecution. Critic Charles Meigs exemplified this belief of the physiological value in parturition pain, which the greater public supported throughout the mid 19th century.

The natural benefits of such labor pains which initially inhibited the practice of obstetrical analgesia, originated from another religious consideration of perfection. Religious opponents argued that individuals of God's creation and His standard of perfection should not be in need of such obstetrical interference. Natural processes employed by the Almighty Himself should be left untouched. In support of this claim, M. Roussel advocated that the refinement of society through technical operations (i.e. anesthesia) causes more harm then good to the natural process of childbirth.

=== Medical objections ===
Medical historian Richard Shyrock suggested that humanitarian sentiments motivated 19th century physicians, while science shaped their practice. Victorian practitioners believed that if suffering was preventable it was their duty to abolish it in any way possible. Though physicians responsible for administering anesthesia were known to evade interfering in delivery if the mother was an uncivilized member of society. These individuals were left to their own resources, perhaps benefiting from midwife assistance. The pathological process of childbirth was seen to be of necessity for successful delivery and dulling the pain of contractions would hinder this process, until Simpson was able to overturn this theory in 1854. The inhalation of anesthetic agents do not affect the act of labor or the mechanism by which uterine contractions occur, but rather renders the woman insensible to the high degree of pain. With this finding, along with the statistical records of safely executed anesthetic administrations, the medical opposition to obstetric analgesia for pain annulment was suppressed.

The conflicting clinical interpretation of obstetric labor as natural pain, as opposed to discomfort induced by an abnormal or diseased condition, led obstetric practitioners and midwives alike to endorse laissez-faire treatment. Natural, animalistic functions of child rearing were determined thereafter not to require the assistance of obstetricians or subsequent labor analgesia. Following an era of natural philosophy, physicians evoked the ability of wild animals and 'savaged individuals' to deliver offspring in regions where the practice of child rearing had never been reduced to an art form. The likening of any obstetrical practice to mere pretend science, including the delivery of anesthetic agents, further prolonged the advancement of this field considerably throughout the 19th century.

=== Social implications ===
The social distinction of labor analgesia practice strengthened the divide between savaged and civilized society, while highlighting gender roles in medical practice. The results of unassisted labor in uncivilized communities, specifically the vitality of both mom and fetus, were not documented well. The news of this 'anti-obstetric' practice failed to spread to the civilized community, allowing the means of obstetric interference through general and anesthetic intervention to persist. Documentation and statistical evidence was favored throughout the development of obstetric anesthesia to determine the viability of physician strategies. The obstetric diary of midwife Martha Ballard (1735–1812) is historically valued for she documented the details of all midwife calls, as well as physician assistance, instrument usage, and symptoms. Being one of the first women to provide a history of obstetrical practice, Martha Ballard's notes regarding the marginalization of women in medical practice and the arrogance of male physicians were taken into careful consideration.

=== Morphine ===
The isolation of morphine in the early 1800s was yet another milestone in obstetric anesthesia. However, the drug would not be widely used until the invention of the hypodermic needle in the 1850s. The first to use a hypodermic syringe in the United States was Fordyce Barker, who actually received the syringe from H.J Simpson as a gift during a visit to Edinburgh. Eventually, the use of morphine for pain control during labor lost favor due to its effects of respiratory depression in the newborn and was replaced largely by meperidine, a synthetic narcotic, first made in Germany in 1939, that had less of an effect on respiratory depression. Meperidine is still popular in obstetrics today.

=== Local anesthetics ===
Probably the most important discovery in obstetric anesthesia was the introduction of regional anesthesia, in which local anesthetics are used to block pain from a large area (or nerve distribution). Cocaine, the first local anesthetic was used topically in ophthalmology in 1884 by Carl Koller. William Halstead completed the first nerve block; August Bier, the first clinical spinal anesthesia; Sicard and Cathlein, the caudal approach to epidural anesthesia in 1901; and Fidel Pages, the lumbar epidural approach in 1921. In 1921, the first vaginal delivery under spinal analgesia was reported by Kreiss in Germany. George Pitkin is credited with popularizing obstetric spinal anesthesia in the United States. Charles B. Odom introduced lumbar epidural analgesia to obstetrics in 1935.

== Investigations ==
The anesthesiologist relies on several patient monitors intraoperatively to safely care for the patient. These include, but are not limited to, pulse oximetry, capnography, electrocardiogram, non-invasive blood pressure cuff monitoring and temperature. In some cases, arterial blood gas monitoring may be used.

== Treatments ==
Anesthesia for labor and vaginal delivery includes various modalities including pharmacological and non-pharmacological techniques.

=== Non-pharmacological ===
Non-pharmacological techniques include Lamaze breathing, acupuncture, acupressure, LeBoyer technique, transcutaneous nerve stimulation, massage, hydrotherapy, vertical positioning, presence of a support person, intradermal water injections, and biofeedback amongst many more.

Water immersion in the first stage of labor may reduce women's use of epidural. A meta analysis showed there may be benefits to the presence of a support individual (doula, family member) including lower use of pharmacologic analgesia, decreased length of labor, and lower incidence of cesarian section. Hypnosis warrants further investigation.

=== Medications ===
Obstetric anesthesiologists employ the following pharmacological agents and techniques:

- Parenteral (IV) agents: opioids such as meperidine, morphine (rarely used today), and fentanyl
- Inhalation agents: volatile anesthetics such as isoflurane, sevoflurane, and desflurane or nitrous oxide.
- Neuraxial (regional) anesthetic and analgesia techniques: (e.g. epidural, spinal, combined spinal-epidural) are used most widely in the United States today. These regional techniques are considered the most effective form of labor pain relief (vaginal deliveries) with high rates of maternal satisfaction. Other nerve blocks for labor include paracervical and pudendal blocks which target different nerve distributions.

Anesthesia for cesarean sections (C-sections) most commonly uses neuraxial (regional) anesthesia due to its better safety profile for both mother and baby. However, for emergencies or cases where neuraxial anesthesia cannot be used, general anesthesia is used instead. Drugs used to induce general anesthesia include thiopental, propofol, etomidate, and ketamine. Unconsciousness is maintained using inhalation agents, and muscle relaxing agents are used as needed. Opioids are less commonly used prior to delivery due to fear of adverse effects on the neonate. However under certain circumstances it is important to attenuate the hypertensive responses to induction and incision and ultra-short acting opioids (remifentanil and alfentanil) appear to be efficacious and safe.

== Training ==
=== United States ===
In the United States, obstetric anesthesiology is a sub-specialty of anesthesiology (i.e., an anesthesiologist trains for an additional year as a fellow to qualify as an obstetric anesthesiologist).

After earning a four-year undergraduate bachelor's degree, students enroll in a four-year graduate education leading to a degree in medicine (the Doctor of Medicine degree (M.D.)) or in osteopathic medicine (the Doctor of Osteopathic Medicine degree (D.O.)). After receiving a medical degree, students must complete a four-year residency training at an approved anesthesiology program and pass certification exams to become a board-certified, general anesthesiologist. Obstetric anesthesiologists then complete an additional year of study (fellowship) to gain specialized experience. Currently, obstetric anesthesia is not associated with an additional certification period over being board-certified in anesthesiology.

== Ethical and medicolegal issues ==
Anesthesiologists use safe blood transfusions in certain situations as a therapy for patients with low oxygen carrying capacity or to correct coagulation problems. Certain religions (e.g., Jehovah's Witnesses) prohibit the use of blood transfusions based on their religious beliefs. Medical ethics stand on the four pillars of autonomy, beneficence, non-maleficence and justice. Based on the basis of patient autonomy, a person who is deemed to have capacity and refuses a blood transfusion for religious reason has the right to do so.
