= Prairie Township, Kosciusko County, Indiana =

Prairie Township
- Township
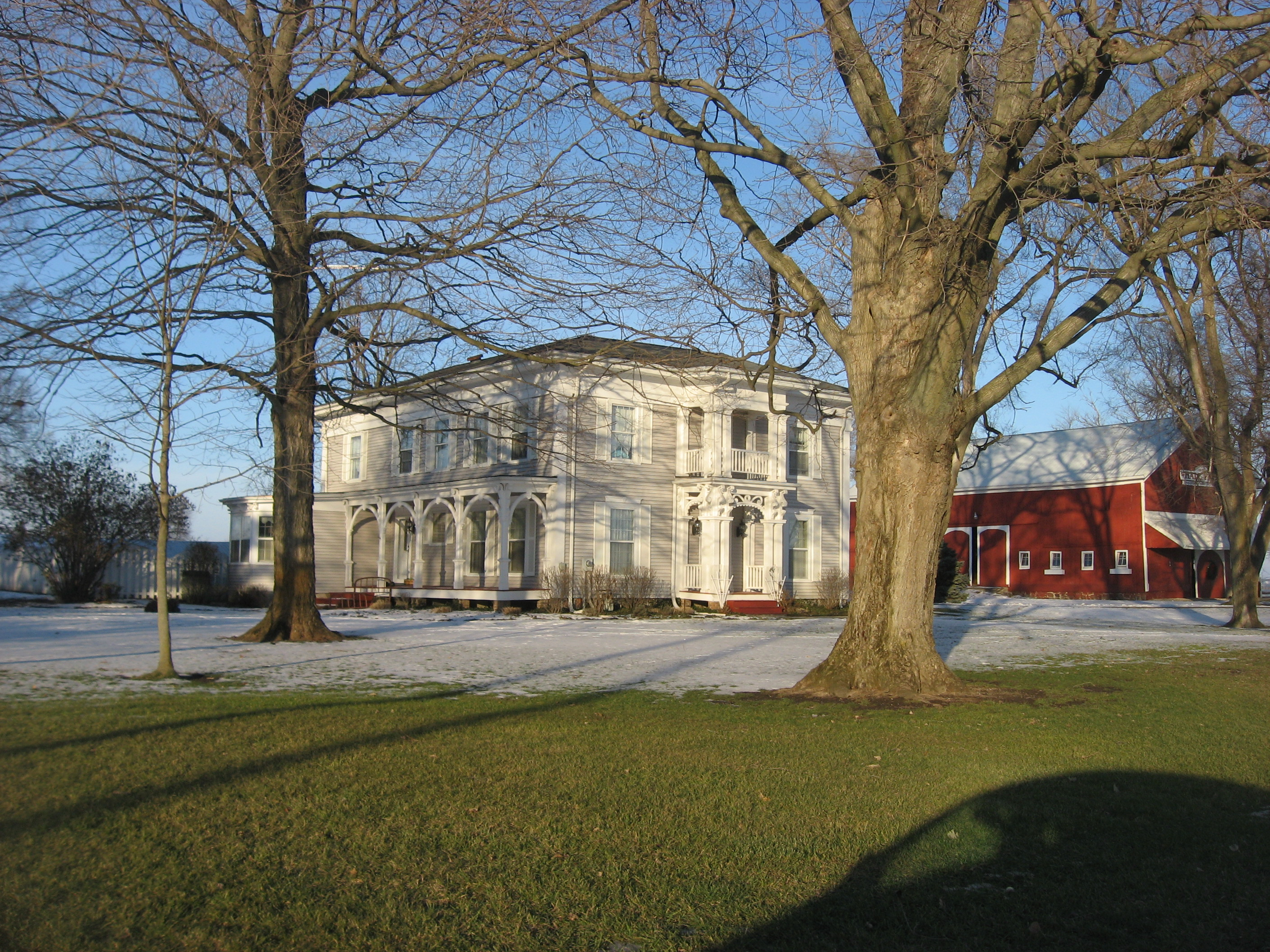
- A farm at Clunette

- Coordinates: 41°17′52″N 85°56′12″W
- Country: United States
- State: Indiana
- County: Kosciusko

Government
  - Type: Indiana township

Area
  - Total: 35.76 sq mi (92.6 km^{2})
  - Land: 35.23 sq mi (91.2 km^{2})
  - Water: 0.52 sq mi (1.3 km^{2})
- Elevation: 850 ft (259 m)

Population (2020)
  - Total: 1,774
  - Density: 46.9/sq mi (18.1/km^{2})
- Time zone: UTC-5 (Eastern (EST))
  - Summer (DST): UTC-4 (EDT)
- FIPS code: 18-61578
- GNIS feature ID: 453769

Historical population
Census	Pop.	Note	%±
1920	855		—
1930	846		−1.1%
1940	824		−2.6%
1950	874		6.1%
1960	911		4.2%
1970	886		−2.7%
1980	1,188		34.1%
1990	1,279		7.7%
2000	1,590		24.3%
2010	1,651		3.8%
2020	1,774		7.5%
US Census:

Prairie Township is one of seventeen townships in Kosciusko County, Indiana. As of the 2020 census, its population was 1,774 (up from 1,651 at 2010) and it contained 682 housing units.

== History ==
Prairie Township was organized in 1838 and named from its setting upon the prairie.

The Hall Farm was listed on the National Register of Historic Places in 1992.

== Geography ==
According to the 2010 census, the township has a total area of 35.76 square miles (92.6 km^{2}), of which 35.23 square miles (91.2 km^{2}) (or 98.52%) is land and 0.52 square miles (1.3 km^{2}) (or 1.45%) is water.

=== Unincorporated towns ===
- Atwood at 41.2608779°N 85.9752735°W
- Clunette at 41.3197679°N 85.9227723°W

(This list is based on USGS data and may include former settlements.)
