= Bellevue Hospital =

Hospital in New York City

- NYC Health + Hospitals

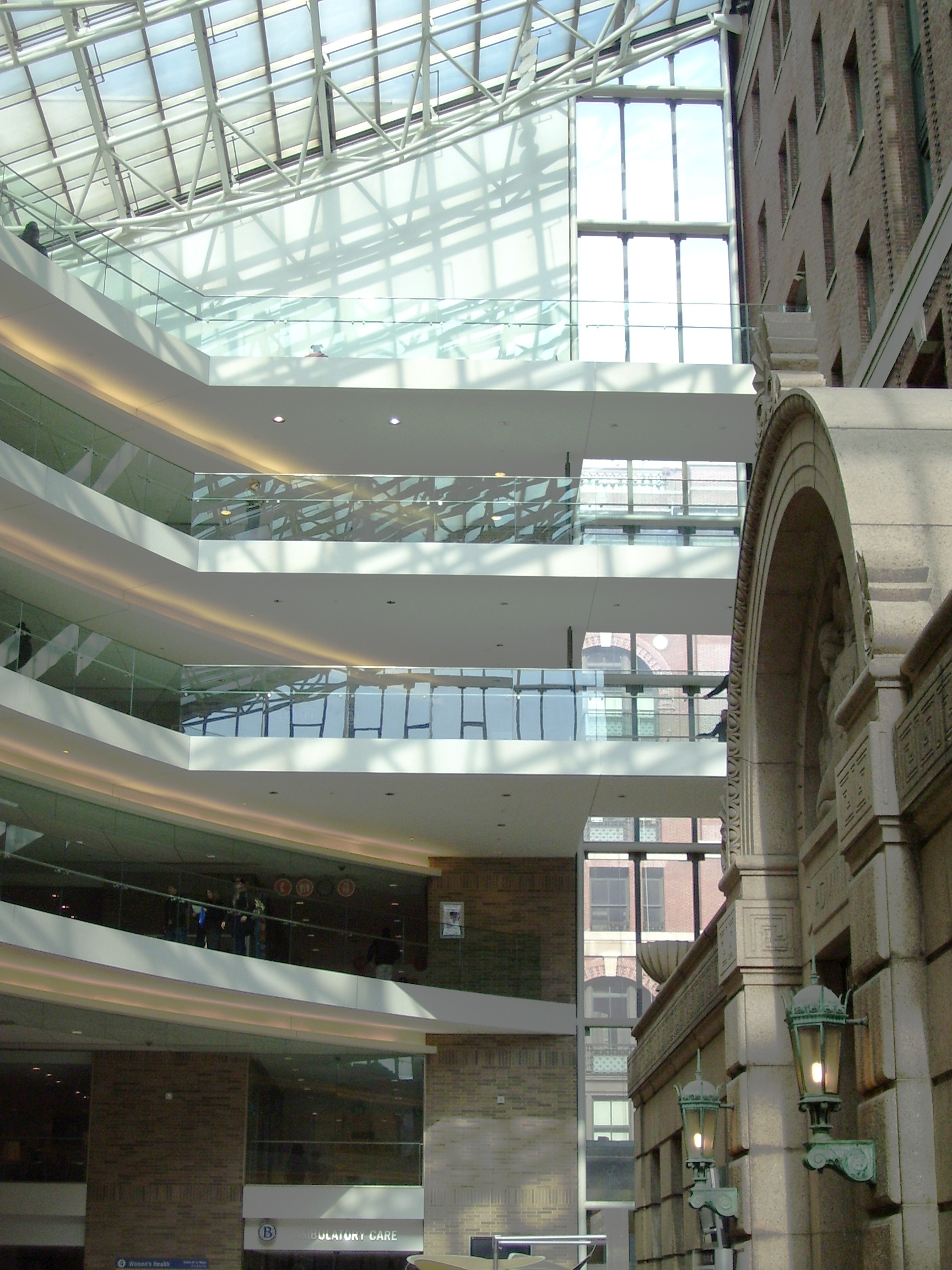

Geography
- Location: 462 First Avenue, Manhattan, New York, New York, United States
- Coordinates: 40°44′21″N 73°58′31″W

Organization
- Type: Teaching
- Affiliated university: New York University School of Medicine
- Network: NYC Health + Hospitals; NYU Langone Health System

Services
- Emergency department: Level I Adult Trauma Center / Level II Pediatric Trauma Center
- Beds: 898

Helipads
- Helipad: East 34th Street Heliport (IATA: TSS)

History
- Founded: March 31, 1736 (290 years ago)

Links
- Website: www.nychealthandhospitals.org/locations/bellevue/
- Lists: Hospitals in New York State
- Other links: Hospitals in Manhattan

Bellevue Hospital (officially NYC Health + Hospitals/Bellevue and formerly known as Bellevue Hospital Center) is a hospital in New York City and the oldest public hospital in the United States. One of the largest hospitals in the United States by number of beds, it is located at 462 First Avenue in the Kips Bay neighborhood of Manhattan, New York City.

Historically, Bellevue was so frequently associated with its treatment of mentally ill patients that "Bellevue" became a local pejorative slang term for a psychiatric hospital.

The hospital has since developed into a comprehensive major medical center. The hospital contains a 25-story patient care facility and has an attending physician staff of 1,200.

Bellevue is a safety net hospital, providing healthcare for individuals regardless of their insurance status or ability to pay. It handles over half a million patient visits each year.

== History ==
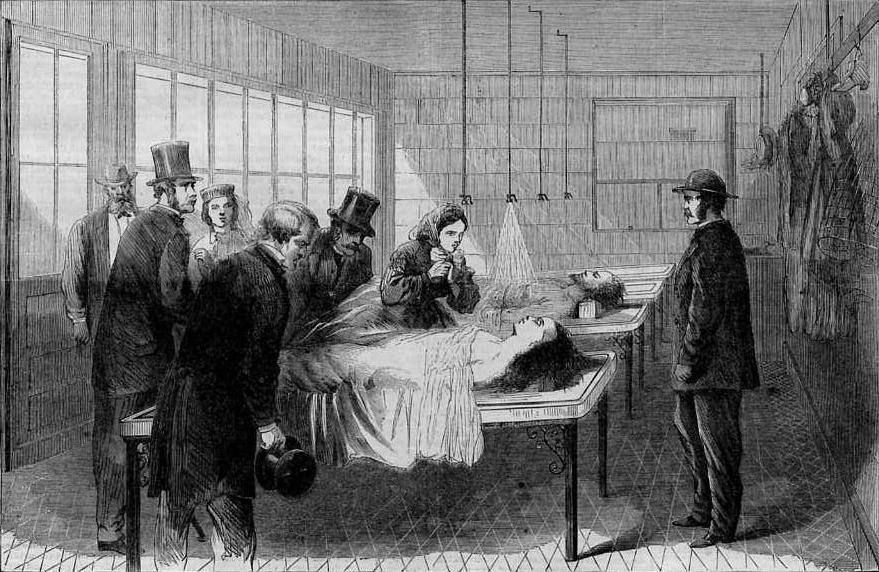
An engraving from 1866 showing the city's first morgue, located in Bellevue

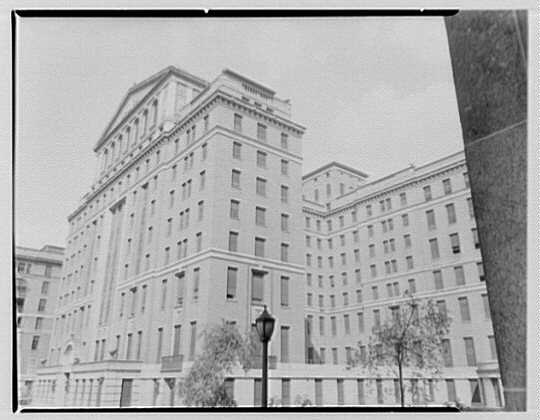
The administration building in 1950

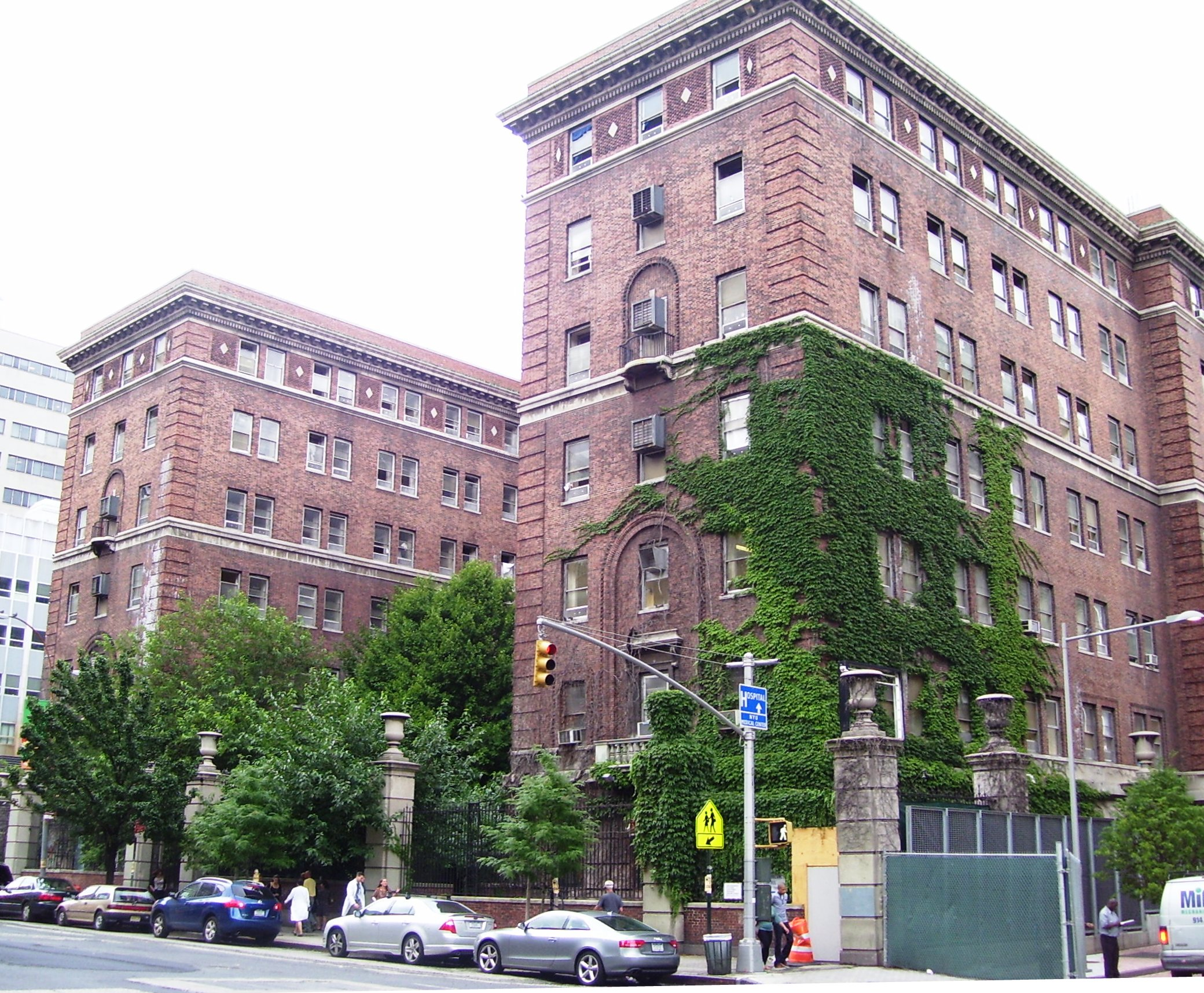
The original psychiatric hospital building

=== Founding ===
Bellevue traces its origins to the city's first permanent almshouse, a two-story brick building completed in 1736 on the city common, now City Hall Park.

In 1798, the city purchased Belle Vue farm, a property near the East River several miles north of the settled city, which had been used to quarantine the sick during a series of yellow fever outbreaks.

The hospital was formally named Bellevue Hospital in 1824.

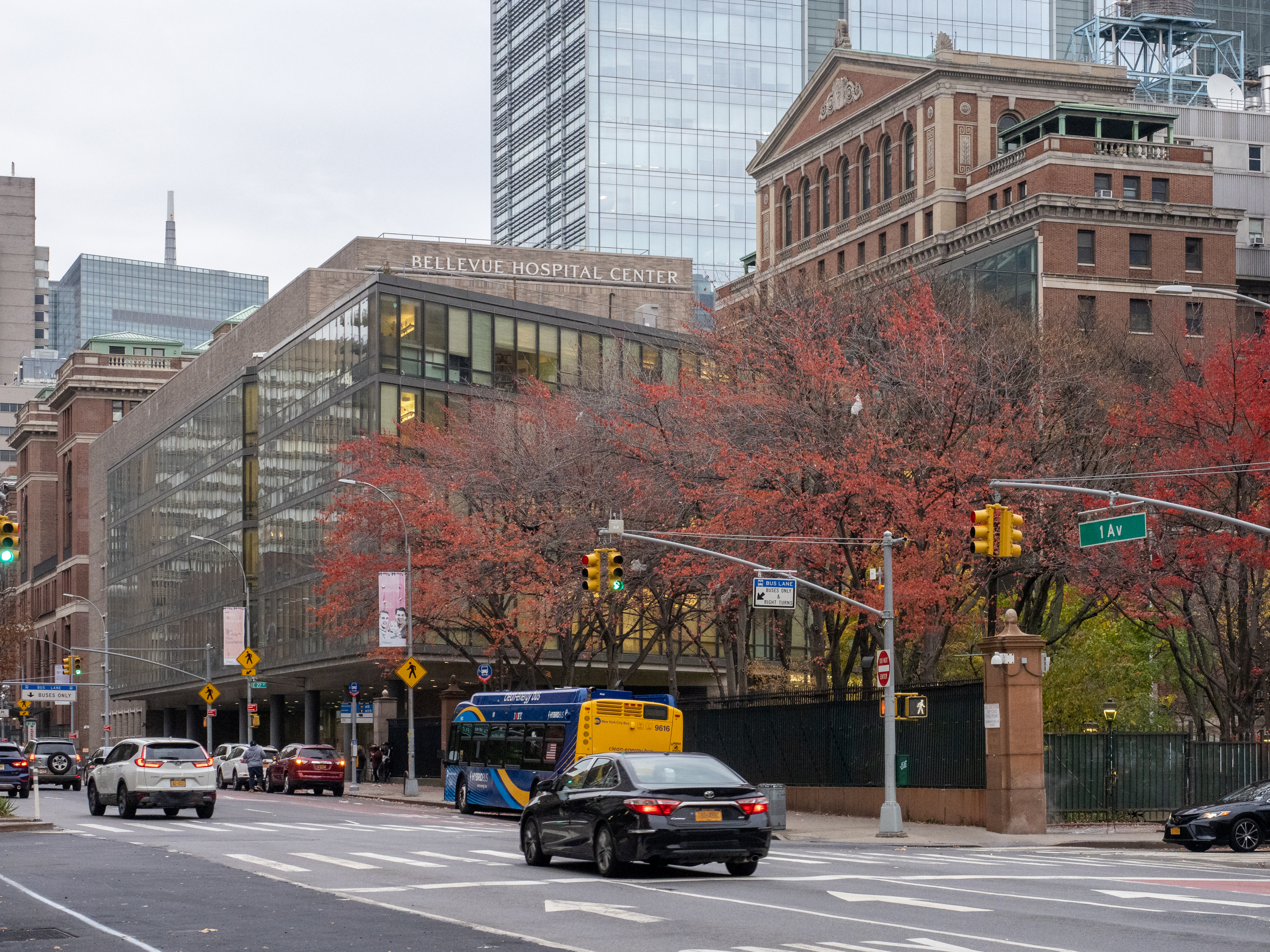
Bellevue Hospital – NYC

As early as 1787, the Almshouse Hospital p, Bellevue's predecessor, was being used for medical teaching. Columbia faculty and students would remain at Bellevue for the next 181 years, until the restructuring of the academic affiliations of Bellevue Hospital in 1968. Clinical instruction by New York university at Bellevue Hospital began in 1847. In 1849, an amphitheater for clinical teaching and surgery opened. In 1861, Bellevue Hospital Medical College was established, the first medical college in New York with a direct link to a hospital.

By 1873, the nation's first nursing school based on Florence Nightingale's principles opened at Bellevue, followed by the nation's first children's clinic in 1874 and the nation's first emergency pavilion in 1876; a pavilion for the insane, an approach considered revolutionary at the time, was erected within hospital grounds in 1879. For that reason, the name Bellevue is sometimes used as a metonym for psychiatric hospitals. Mark Harris in New York called it "the Chelsea Hotel of the mad".

Bellevue initiated a residency training program in 1883. The Carnegie Laboratory, the nation's first pathology and bacteriology laboratory, was founded there a year later,followed by the nation's first men's nursing school in 1888. By 1892, Bellevue established a dedicated unit for alcoholics.

=== City reorganization ===
In 1902, the administrative Bellevue and Allied Hospitals ("B&AH") organization were formed by the city, under president John W. Brannan. B&AH also included Gouverneur Hospital, Harlem Hospital, and Fordham Hospital. B&AH provided career opportunities to female and black physicians.

In the midst of a tuberculosis epidemic a year later, the Bellevue Chest Service was founded. Bellevue opened the nation's first ambulatory cardiac clinic in 1911,followed by the Western Hemisphere's first ward for metabolic disorders in 1913.

New York City's Office of the Chief Medical Examiner began in the R & S Building in 1918. German spy and saboteur Fritz Joubert Duquesne escaped the hospital prison ward in 1919 after having feigned paralysis for nearly two years.

In 1935, Public School 106, the first public school for the emotionally disturbed children, opened at Bellevue in 1935.

From 1937 to 1941, David Margolis and his assistants painted nine Works Progress Administration mural panels in Bellevue's rotunda. In 1939, Bellevue established the world's first hospital catastrophe unit. In 1940, Andrè Cournand and Dickinson Richards established the world's first cardiopulmonary laboratory at Bellevue. In 1952, Bellevue opened the nation's first heart-failure clinic.

In 1960, the Office of Chief Medical Examiner opened its new headquarters on 520 First Avenue. In1962, Bellevue established the first intensive care unit in a New York City public hospital, and in 1964, Bellevue was designated as the stand-by hospital for treatment of visiting presidents, foreign dignitaries, injured members of the city's uniformed services, and United Nations diplomats. In 1970, Bellevue became part of New York City Health and Hospitals Corporation and became its flagship hospital.

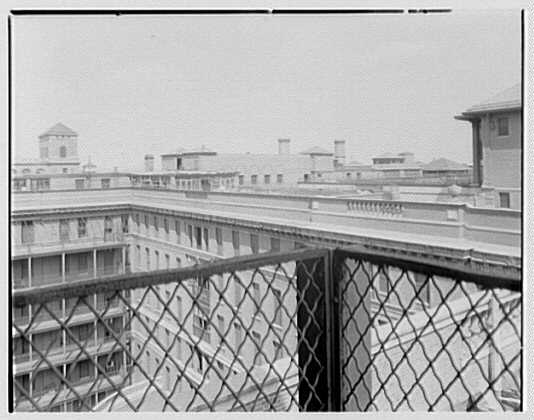
The former buildings of Bellevue Hospital. They were shortly demolished after the "Cube" was completed.

In 1981, Bellevue was certified as an official heart station for cardiac emergencies. By 1983, Bellevue was designated as a level one trauma center. In 1988, Bellevue was recognized by the city's Emergency Medical Services as a head and spinal cord injury center.

In 1990, Bellevue and New York University an accredited residency training program in emergency medicine. The building that formerly served as the hospital's psychiatric facility started to be used as a homeless intake center and a men's homeless shelter in 1998. The Bellevue Literary Review, the first literary journal to arise from a medical setting, published its first issue in 2001. Bellevue Literary press began publishing books in 2007.

In April 2010, plans to redevelop the former psychiatric hospital building as a hotel and conference center connected to NYU Langone Medical Center fell through. The aftermath of Hurricane Sandy in October 2012 required the evacuation of patients after severe flooding in the hospital's basement damaged critical mechanical and electrical systems, including the fuel pumps for the backup generators. Bellevue was renamed NYC Health + Hospitals/Bellevue in November 2015 as a reflection of its parent organization's rebranding.

In 2014 Bellevue was ranked 29th in New York State and 40th in New York City U.S. News & World Report.

== Medical firsts ==
Multiple firsts were performed at Bellevue in its early years. In 1799, it established its first maternity ward in the United States. In 1808, the first femoral artery ligation was performed there, followed by the first innominate artery artery ligation in 1818.

In 1854, New York State passed legislation known as the "Bone Bill," legalizing the dissection of human bodies for anatomical studies. In 1856, Bellevue physician Fordyce Barker introduced the use of the hypodermic syringe in the United States. In 1862, the Austin Flint murmur was named for Austin Flint, a prominent Bellevue physician. In 1866, Bellevue physicians were instrumental in developing New York City’s sanitary code, the first in the world. In 1867, Bellevue opened the Bureau of Medical and Surgical Relief for the Out-of-Door Poor, the first outpatient department in the United States with a direct link to a hospital. In 1868, Bellevue physician Stephen Smith was named the first Commissioner of Public Health in New York City. In 1871, Smith undertook the first national health vaccination campaign.

In 1872, Bellevue established the second hospital-based, emergency ambulance service in the United States. In 1889, Bellevue physicians were the first to report that tuberculosis was a preventable disease. In 1894, Bellevue physician William T. Bull performed the first successful operation of the abdomen for a pistol-shot wound.

William Tillett discovered streptokinase in 1933; it was later used as a thrombolytic agent in the treatment of acute myocardial infarction. In 1967, Bellevue physicians performed the first cadaver kidney transplant. In 1971, Bellevue physicians developed the first active immunization for hepatitis B. Bellevue played a key role in the development of the "Triple Drug Cocktail" or HAART, a breakthrough in the treatment of AIDS, in 1996.

In October 2014, Bellevue took in an Ebola patient, Craig Spencer, an individual who worked with Médecins Sans Frontières (Doctors Without Borders) in Guinea a month prior during the 2014 Ebola virus epidemic in West Africa.

=== Other innovations ===
David Wechsler served as chief psychologist at Bellevue Psychiatric Hospital from 1932 to 1967 and developed a series of influential intelligence tests, including the Wechsler Adult Intelligence Scale (WAIS) and the Wechsler Intelligence Scale for Children (WISC). By the 1960's, the Wechsler scales had surpassed the Stanford-Binet in popularity.

== Facilities ==
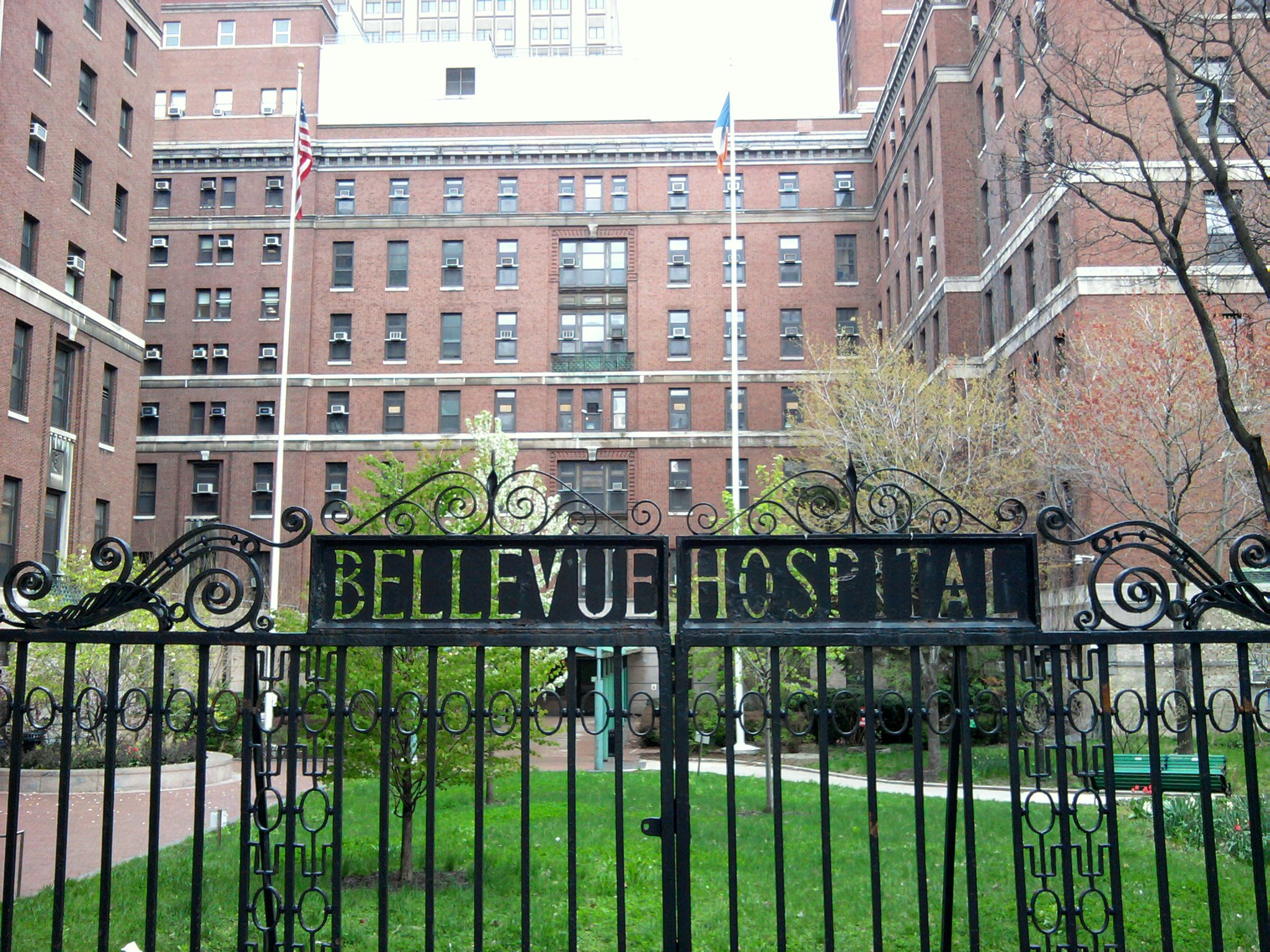
Front gate of the hospital

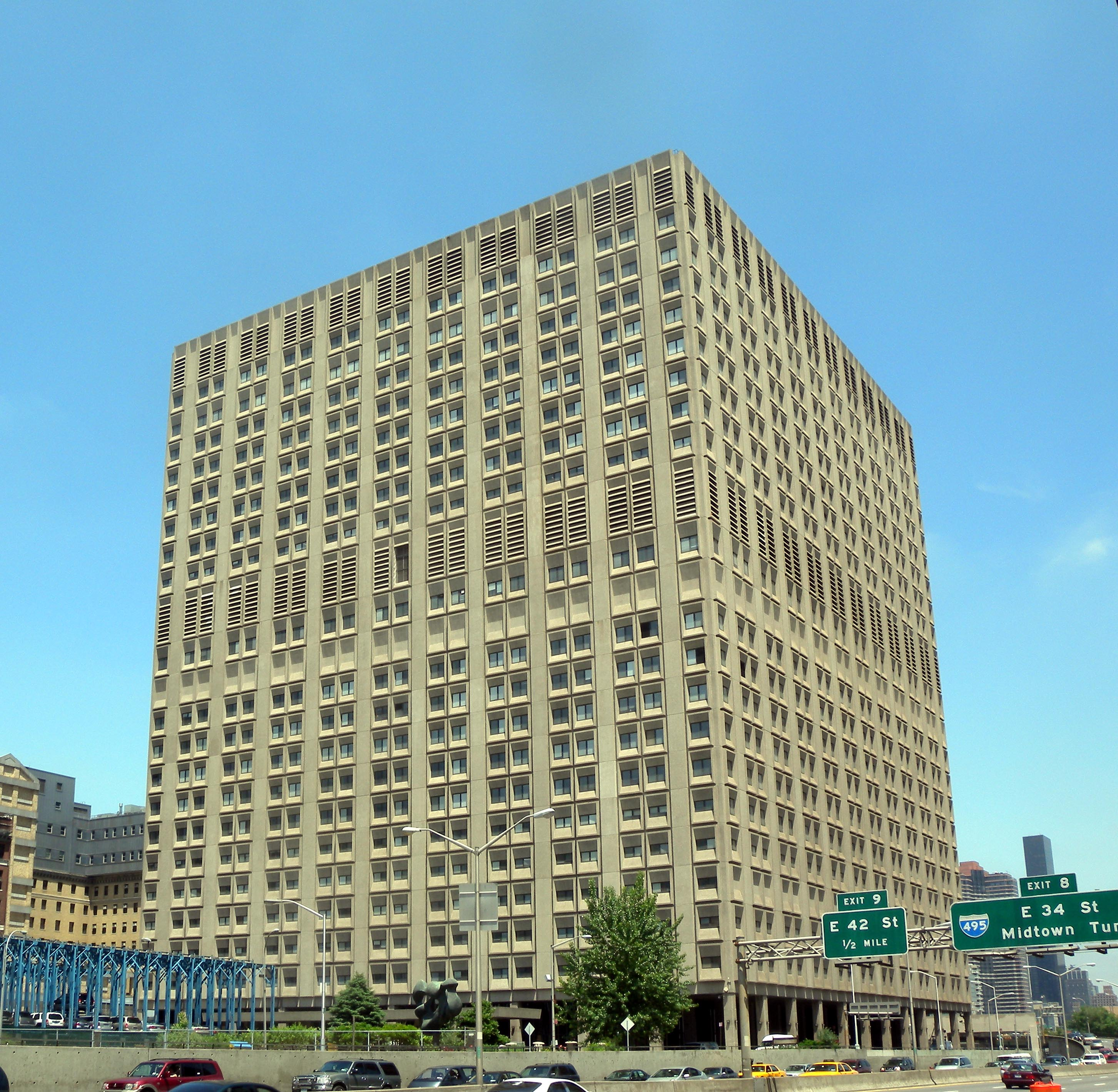
The "Cube", built in 1971–74 along FDR Drive at the East River

One of the largest hospitals in the United States by number of beds, it handles nearly 460,000 non-ER outpatient clinic visits, nearly 106,000 emergency visits and some 30,000 inpatients each year. More than 80 percent of Bellevue's patients come from the city's medically underserved populations. Bellevue is a safety net hospital, in that it will provide healthcare for individuals regardless of their insurance status or ability to pay.

The hospital’s facilities include a 25-story patient care facility with more than 800 inpatient beds and six intensive care units, as well as a six-story ambulatory care pavilion. Bellevue has more than 1,200 full-time attending physicians.

Bellevue has separate pediatric and adult emergency services, with the pediatric service providing care to children and young adults under the age of 25.

== In popular culture ==
Bellevue has entered popular consciousness through its status as a major hospital in the largest city in the United States. The hospital notably treated the author Norman Mailer, who was taken to Bellevue after he stabbed his wife; and Mark David Chapman, was treated at Bellevue for psychiatric evaluation after he shot and killed musician John Lennon in 1980 and was later transferred between Bellevue and Riker's Island.

The poet Allen Ginsberg, mentioned Bellevue by name is his poem "Howl" In the 1945 film The Lost Weekend, Ray Milland character, Don Birnam is hospitalized at Bellevue for alcoholism and later escapes.

Bellevue has been the subject of books, including Bellevue: Three Centuries of Medicine and Mayhem at America's Most Storied Hospital (2016), by historian David Oshinsky, Twelve Patients: Life and Death at Bellevue Hospital (2012), by Eric Manheimer, a former Bellevue medical director, and Singular Intimacies: Becoming a Doctor at Bellevue (2002), by Danielle Ofri, a long-time physician at Bellevue.

Bellevue's psychiatric emergency room was the subject of the 2001 HBO Documentary Bellevue: Inside Out. The 2018 NBC television series New Amsterdam takes place at a fictionalized version of Bellevue, renamed "New Amsterdam" in the show. Based on Manheimer's book, the series has filmed scenes at Bellevue and other New York City public hospitals.

== See also ==
- List of the oldest hospitals in the United States
