= Sam (given name) =

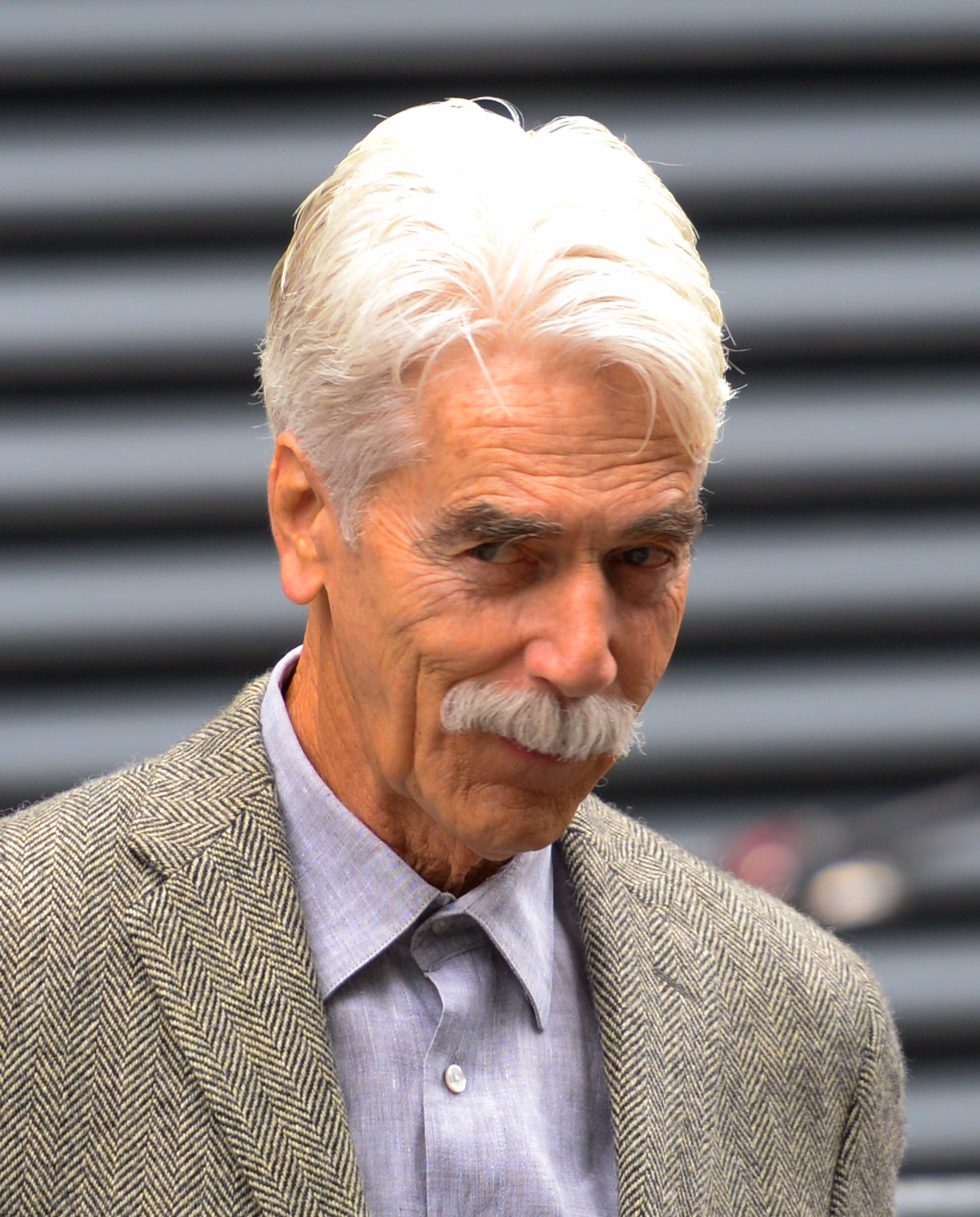
- Sam Elliott in 2018
- Pronunciation: /ˈsæm/
- Gender: Male

Other names
- Related names: Samuel, Sammy, Samson, Samantha

Sam is a unisex given name. It is often short for other names, such as Samuel or Samantha.

== A ==
- Sam Aanestad (1946–2018), American politician
- Sam Aaron (1911–1996), American businessman
- Sam Aaronovitch (1919–1998), English economist
- Sam Aarons (1895–1971), Australian radical activist and communist
- Sam Abal (born 1958), Papua New Guinean politician
- Sam Abbas (born 1993), Egyptian film producer and director
- Sam Abbott (Canadian football) (born 1921), Canadian football player and a sailor
- Sam Abell (born 1945), American photographer
- Sam Abouo (born 1973), Ivorian footballer
- Sam Aboyeji (born 1960), Nigerian minister and denominational leader
- Sam Abrams (1935–2023), American poet
- Sam Acheampong (born 1996), Canadian football player
- Sam Acho (born 1988), American football player
- Sam Acquah (1943–c. 2014), Ghanaian footballer
- Sam Adams (disambiguation), multiple people, including
  - Sam Adams (American football) (born 1973), American football player
  - Sam Adams (Canadian football) (1928–2015), American gridiron football player
  - Sam Adams (explorer) (1828–1915), American explorer
  - Sam Adams (footballer, born 1989), Ghanaian professional footballer
  - Sam Adams (golfer) (born 1946), American professional golfer
  - Sam Adams (Oregon politician) (born 1963), American politician
  - Sam Adams Sr. (1948–2015), American football player
- Sam Adegoke (born 1982), Nigerian-American actor
- Sam Adekugbe (born 1995), Canadian soccer player
- Sam Adjei (1948–2016), Ghanaian public health figure
- Sam Adkins (American football) (born 1955), American football player
- Sam Adkins (footballer) (born 1991), English footballer
- Sam Adkins (fighter) (born 1965), American MMA fighter
- Sam Adonis (born 1989), American professional wrestler
- Sam Agarwal (born 1990), Indian cricketer
- Sam Agee (1915–2006), American football player
- Sam Agnew (1887–1951), American baseball player
- Sam Ahkeah (1896–1967), Navajo Nation chairman
- Sam Ahmedzai (born 1950), British care specialist
- Sam Ahn (born 1981), South Korean businessman
- Sam Aiken (born 1980), American football player and coach
- Sam Ainsley (born 1950), British artist & teacher
- Sam Aiona (born 1965), American politician based in Hawaii
- Sam Aiston (born 1976), English footballer
- Sam Akoitai (1961–2021), Papua New Guinean politician
- Sam Akromah (born 1960), Ghanaian boxer
- Sam Yahya Al-Ahmar, Yemeni politician
- Say Sam Al (born 1980), Cambodian politician
- Sam Alabi (born 2009), English footballer
- Sam Albatros, Greek writer
- Sam Aldegheri (born 2001), Italian baseball player
- Sam Aleckson (c. 1852–1946), African-American freedman and author
- Sam Alexander (Royal Marine) (1982–2011), Royal Marine
- Sam Alford (born 1986), English rugby union player
- Sam Allardyce (born 1954), English football manager and player
- Sam Allen (football manager) (1868–1946), English football manager
- Sam Allen (musician) (1909–1963), American jazz pianist
- Sam Allen (actor) (1861–1934), American actor
- Sam Allgood (born 1967), American economist
- Sam Allison (born 1980), English football referee
- Sam Alper (1924–2002), English caravan designer
- Sam Altman (born 1985), American entrepreneur
- Sam Aluko (1929–2012), Nigerian public economist and scholar
- Sam Alves (born 1989), Brazilian singer
- Sam Alvey (born 1986), American mixed martial artist
- Sam Amidon (born 1981), American musician
- Sam Amo-Ameyaw (born 2006), English footballer
- Sam Amuka-Pemu (born 1935), Nigerian journalist
- Sam Anas (born 1993), American ice hockey player
- Sam Anderson (born 1945), American actor
- Sam Anderson (Tamil actor) (born 1977), Indian actor
- Sam Anderson (rugby league) (born 1991), Australian rugby league footballer
- Sam Anderson (writer), American author
- Sam Anderson (footballer) (fl. 1912–1925), Scottish footballer
- Sam Anderson-Heather (born 1988), Cook Islands international rugby union player
- Sam Andrew (1941–2015), American rock musician, singer-songwriter
- Sam Andrews (born 1982), English cricketer
- Sam Angel (1920–2007), American poker player
- Sam Angel (soccer) (born 2000), American soccer player
- Sam Angus (writer) (born 1967), English writer
- Sam Korankye Ankrah (born 1960), Ghanaian minister and televangelist
- Sam Anning (born 1980), Australian jazz bassist
- Sam Anno (born 1965), American football player and coach
- Sam Ansley, American football player
- Sam Anton (born 1985), Indian film director and screenwriter
- Sam Antonacci (born 2003), American baseball player
- Sam Uche Anyamele, Nigerian actor
- Sam Appel (1871–1947), American actor
- Sam Ard (1939–2017), American racing driver
- Sam Arday (1945–2017), Ghanaian football coach
- Sammy Arnold (born 1996), English-born, Irish rugby player
- Sam Arnull (c. 1760 – 1800), British jockey
- Sam Aronson (1942–2026), American physicist
- Sam Arora (born 1981), American politician
- Sam Aryeetey (born 1929), Ghanaian film producer
- Sam Asghari (born 1994), American model and fitness trainer
- Sam Ash (1897–1956), Violinist, teacher, and entrepreneur
- Sam Ashaolu (born 1982), American basketball player
- Sam Ashford (born 1995), English footballer
- Sam Ashton (born 1986), English footballer
- Sam Ashworth (songwriter) (born 1980), American songwriter and producer
- Sam Ask (1878–1937), Swedish screenwriter and actor
- Sam Aspland-Robinson (born 1997), English rugby union player
- Sam Aston (born 1993), English actor
- Sam Atkin (born 1993), British athlete
- Sam Atkinson (1899–1966), English cricketer
- Sam Attwater (born 1986), English actor and singer
- Chimaobi Sam Atu (born 1982), Nigerian politician
- Sam Atwell (born 1979), Australian actor
- Sam Atyeo (1910–1990), Australian artist and diplomat
- Sam Aubrey (1922–2008), American basketball player and coach
- Sam Austin (born 1996), English footballer
- Sam Avey (1895–1962), American businessman and sports promoter
- Sam Avezou (born 2001), French rock climber
- Sam Ayers (born 1962), American actor
- Sam Ayorinde (born 1974), Nigerian footballer
- Sam Ayoub, Australian rugby league and rugby union sports agent
- Sam Azoulay (born 1936), Moroccan wrestler

== B ==
- Sam Babcock (1901–1970), American football player
- Sam Baker (disambiguation), multiple people, including
  - Sam Baker (actor) (1907–1982), American actor
  - Sam Baker (Australian footballer) (1874–1946), Australian rules footballer
  - Sam Baker (kicker) (1930–2007), American football player
  - Sam Baker (musician) (born 1954), American singer-songwriter
  - Sam Baker (offensive tackle) (born 1985), American football player
  - Sam Baker (writer) (born 1966), British writer and editor
- Sam Balter (1909–1998), American basketball player
- Sam Bankman-Fried (born 1992), American entrepreneur and suspected fraudster
- Sam Barkas (1909–1989), English football player and manager
- Sam Barlow (disambiguation), multiple people, including
  - Sam Barlow (game designer) (born 1901), British video game designer
  - Sam Barlow (pioneer) (1792–1867), American pioneer and early settler of Oregon
  - Sam Barlow (rugby league) (born 1988), Scotland international rugby league footballer
- Sam Bass (disambiguation), multiple people, including
  - Sam Bass (artist) (1961–2019), American motorsports artist
  - Sam Bass (outlaw) (1851–1878), American Old West outlaw
  - Sam Bass (politician) (1944–2018), Australian politician
  - Sam Bass (wrestler) (1935–1976), American professional wrestler
- Sam Beal (born 1996), American football player
- Sam Beeton (born 1988), British singer-songwriter and musician
- Sam Bennett (disambiguation), multiple people, including
  - Sam Bennett (baseball) (1884–1969), Baseball player
  - Sam Bennett (cyclist) (born 1990), Irish racing cyclist
  - Sam Bennett (folk musician) (1865–1951), English Morris dancer
  - Sam Bennett (golfer) (born 1999), American professional golfer
  - Sam Bennett (hurdler) (born 2001), British athlete
  - Sam Bennett (ice hockey) (born 1996), Canadian ice hockey player
- Sam Bith (c. 1933–2008), Cambodian guerrilla commander and convicted murderer
- Sam Bohne (1896–1977), American baseball player
- Sam Born (1891–1959), American businessman, candy-maker and inventor
- Sam Bottoms (1955–2008), American actor and producer
- Sam Boyd (1910–1993), American businessman and casino manager and developer
- Sam Bradford (born 1987), American football player
- Sam Brittleton (1885–1951), English footballer
- Sam Brown (disambiguation), multiple people, including
  - Sam Brown (activist) (born 1943), American anti-war activist, politician, and government official
  - Sam Brown (artist) (born 1901), American illustrator and author
  - Sam Brown (baseball) (1878–1931), American baseball player
  - Sam Brown (frontiersman) (1845–1925), American frontiersman and settler
  - Sam Brown (guitarist) (1939–1977), American jazz guitarist
  - Sam Brown (mayor) (1845–1909), Mayor of Wellington from 1887 to 1888
  - Sam Brown (military officer) (born 1983), American politician and military veteran
  - Sam Brown (outlaw) (born 1831), American Criminal
  - Sam Brown (Rastafari) (1925–1998), Jamaican Rastafari elder
  - Sam Brown (singer) (born 1964), English musician
  - Sam Brown (soccer) (born 1996), American soccer player
  - Sam Brown III, American musician
- Sam Brownback (born 1956), American politician from Kansas
- Sam Brunelli (born 1943), American football player
- Sam Burgess (born 1988), English rugby player
- Sam Bush (born 1952), American bluegrass mandolin player
- Sam Buttrey (born 1961), American game-show contestant and podcaster

== C ==
- Sam Carey (disappeared 1903), American fugitive
- Sam Carlson (born 1998), American baseball player
- Sam Carter (disambiguation), multiple people, including
  - Sam Carter (athlete) (born 1991), Australian Paralympic athlete
  - Sam Carter (musician), British singer songwriter
  - Sam Carter (rugby union) (born 1989), Australian rugby union player
- Sam Cassell (born 1969), American basketball player and assistant coach
- Sam Castronova (born 1996), American football player
- Sam Chisholm (1939–2018), New Zealand-born media executive
- Sam Clark (born 1987), Australian actor, singer and songwriter
- Sam Clay (born 1993), American baseball player
- Sam Clemons (born 1978), American football player
- Sam Cogan (born 1997), Canadian ice hockey player
- Sam Collier (1912–1950), American advertising entrepreneur
- Sam Collins (disambiguation), multiple people, including
  - Sam Collins (Australian footballer) (born 1994), Australian rules footballer
  - Sam Collins (chess player) (born 1982), Irish chess player
  - Sam Collins (footballer, born 1977), English football manager
  - Sam Collins (footballer, born 1989), English footballer
  - Sam Collins (music hall) (1825–1865), English music hall comedian and proprietor
  - Sam Collins (musician) (1887–1949), American blues singer and guitarist
- Sam Concepcion (born 1992), Filipino singer
- Sam Cooke (1931–1964), American singer, songwriter, and entrepreneur
- Sam Coonrod (born 1992), American baseball player
- Sam Cooper (American football) (1909–1998), American football player
- Sam Cooper (baseball) (born 1897), American baseball player
- Sam Cooper (journalist), Canadian investigative journalist
- Sam Cooper (American football) (1909–1998), American football player
- Sam Coslow (1902–1982), American songwriter, singer and film producer
- Sam Cosmi (born 1999), American football player
- Sam Cozart (born 2006), American baseball player
- Sam Crawford (1880–1968), American baseball player
- Sam Cunningham (1950–2021), American football player

== D ==
- Sam Daly (born 1984), American actor
- Sam Darnold (born 1997), American football player
- Sam Dastyari (born 1983), Iranian-born Australian politician from New South Wales
- Sam Davies (disambiguation), multiple people, including
  - Sam Davies (cricketer) (born 1992), Welsh cricketer
  - Sam Davies (footballer, born 1870) (1870–1913), English footballer
  - Sam Davies (footballer, born 1894) (1894–1972), Welsh footballer
  - Sam Davies (rugby union) (born 1993), Welsh rugby union player
- Sam Davis (1842–1863), Confederate soldier and spy
- Sammy Davis Jr. (1925–1990), American singer, actor, comedian and dancer
- Sam Day (disambiguation), multiple people, including
  - Sam Day (Australian footballer) (born 1992), Australian rules footballer
  - Sam Day (jockey) (1802–1866), English jockey, uncle of Sam Day Jr.
  - Sam Day (rugby league) (born 1994), English rugby league footballer
  - Sam Day Jr. (1818–1838), British jockey
- Sam De Grasse (1875–1953), Canadian actor
- Sam Delaplane (born 1995), American baseball pitcher
- Sam Demel (born 1985), American baseball pitcher
- Sam Denby (born 1998), American YouTuber
- Sam Donaldson (born 1934), American reporter and news anchor
- Sam Duncan, Irish football player
- Sam Dunell (born 1990), Australian football player

== E ==
- Sam Earl (1915–2000), English footballer
- Sam Easton (born 1979), Canadian actor
- Sam Eckholm, American veteran and influencer
- Sam Edmonston (1883–1979), American baseball player
- Sam Edwards (1915–2004), American actor
- Sam Edwards (physicist) (1928–2015), Welsh physicist
- Sam Edwards (rugby league), NZ international rugby league footballer
- Sam Edwards (rugby union) (born 2002), English rugby union player
- Sam Loco Efe (1939–2011), Nigerian actor
- Sam Effah (born 1988), Canadian sprinter
- Sam Egesa, Anglican bishop in Uganda
- Sam Eggington (born 1993), British boxer
- Sam Eguavoen (born 1993), American football player
- Sam Egwu (born 1954), Nigerian politician
- Sam Ehlinger (born 1998), American football player
- Sam Eig (1898–1982), American real estate developer
- Sam Eljamel (born 1957), Libyan surgeon
- Sam Elkas (born 1938), Canadian politician
- Sam Elliott (born 1944), American actor
- Sam Elliott (cricketer) (born 2000), Australian cricketer
- J. Sam Ellis (born 1955), American politician from North Carolina
- Sam Ellis (footballer) (born 1946), English footballer and manager
- Sam Ellis (runner) (born 1982), British 800 metres runner from Barnsley
- Sam Ellis (cricketer) (died 1946), English cricketer
- Sam Ellis (songwriter) (born 1987), Canadian songwriter and record producer
- Sam Emery (1885–1967), New Zealand farmer and politician
- Sam Endicott (born 1974), American musician
- Suk Sam Eng, Cambodian politician
- Sam English (1908–1967), Northern Irish footballer
- Sam Engola (born 1958), Ugandan businessman and politician
- Sam Erger (born 1989), American volleyball player and coach
- Sam Ermolenko (born 1960), American speedway rider
- Sam Ernst, American television writer and producer
- Sam Ervin (1896–1985), United States Senator and jurist
- Sam J. Ervin IV (born 1955), American judge
- Sam Eshaghoff (born 1992), American real estate developer and former illegal test-taker
- Sam Esmail (born 1977), American screenwriter, director, and producer
- Sam Etcheverry (1930–2009), American gridiron football player
- Sam Sam Etetegwung, Nigerian politician
- Sam Evans (television personality), British Big Brother contestant
- Sam Evans (footballer) (born 1904), Scottish footballer
- Sam Evans (cricketer) (born 1997), English cricketer
- Sam Everett (1901–1970), Australian cricketer
- Sam Everington, British physician and administrator
- Sam Everon (1922–1960), Australian rules footballer
- Sam Evian, American singer-songwriter
- Sam Ewang (born 1952), Former military administrator
- Sam Ewing (born 1949), American baseball player
- Sam Eyde (1866–1940), Norwegian engineer and businessman
- Sam Ezersky (born 1995), American puzzle editor

== F ==
- Sam Faber (born 1987), American ice hockey player
- Sam Farr (born 1941), American politician from California
- Sam Fatu (born 1965), American wrestler
- Sam Feldt (born 1993), Dutch DJ and music producer
- Sam Fellows (born 1993), Canadian racing driver
- Sam Peter Christopher Fernando (1909-after 1962), Sri Lankan lawyer, diplomat, and politician
- Sam Fisher (disambiguation), multiple people, including
  - Sam Fisher (Australian footballer) (born 1982), Australian rules footballer
  - Sam Fisher (cyclist) (born 2006), British track cyclist
  - Sam Fisher (Scottish footballer) (born 2001), Scottish footballer
- Sam Fletcher (disambiguation), multiple people, including
  - Sam Fletcher (baseball) (born 1881), American baseball player
  - Sam Fletcher (footballer) (1890–1972), English footballer
  - Sam Fletcher (singer) (1933–1989), American singer
- Sam Francis (1923–1994), American painter and printmaker
- Sam Franklin Jr. (born 1996), American football player
- Sam Fuld (born 1981), American baseball player and manager

== G ==
- Sam Gagner (born 1989), Canadian ice hockey player
- Sam Gargan (footballer) (born 1989), English football player
- Sam Gargan (politician) (1948–2025), Canadian politician
- Sam George (disambiguation), multiple people, including
  - Sam George (activist) (1952–2009), Canadian activist
  - Sam George (soccer) (born 1970), American soccer player
  - Sam George (surfer), American surfer and writer
  - Sam Nartey George (born 1985), Ghanaian politician
- Sam Giammalva (born 1934), American tennis player
- Sam Giancana (1908–1975), Italian-American mobster, boss of the Chicago Outfit
- Sam Gibson (disambiguation), multiple people, including
  - Sam Gibson (baseball) (1899–1983), American baseball player
  - Sam Gibson (footballer) (born 1986), Australian rules footballer
- Sam Gilley (born 1994), English boxer
- Samuel Goldwyn (1882–1974), Polish-American film producer
- Sam Gutowitz (1904–1991), American businessman, founder of the Sam Goody record store chain

== H ==
- Sam Hagen (born 2003), American football player
- Sam Haggerty (born 1994), American baseball player
- Sam Hanks (1914–1994), American racecar driver
- Sam Harding (disambiguation), multiple people, including
  - Sam Harding (athlete) (born 1991), Australian Paralympic athlete
  - Sam Harding (rugby union) (born 1980), Rugby player
- Sam Harris (born 1967), American author, neuroscientist and philosopher
- Sam Harrison (disambiguation), multiple people, including
  - Sam Harrison (cyclist) (born 1992), Welsh cyclist
  - Sam Harrison (rugby union) (born 1990), English rugby union player
- Sam Hartman (born 1999), American football player
- Sam Hecht (born 2003), American football player
- Sam Henry (musician) (1956–2022), American drummer
- Sam Henry (musicologist) (1870–1952), Irish journalist and musicologist
- Sam Hentges (born 1996), American baseball player
- Sam Hentges (ice hockey) (born 1999), American ice hockey player
- Sam Heughan (born 1980), Scottish actor
- Sam Hill (disambiguation), multiple people, including
  - Sam Hill (baseball) (1926–1977), American baseball player
  - Sam Hill (cyclist) (born 1985), Australian professional mountain biker
  - Sam Hill (director) (born 2000), American television director and producer
  - Sam Hill (rugby union) (born 1993), English rugby union player
- Sam Hilliard (born 1994), American baseball player
- Sam Holmes (baseball) (1915–2010), American baseball player
- Sam Holmes (sailor), American sailor and YouTuber
- Sam Horn (born 1963), American baseball player
- Sam Horn (American football) (born 2003), American football and baseball player
- Sam Hornish Jr. (born 1979), American stock car racing driver
- Sam Houser (born 1971), English-American video game producer and developer
- Sam Houston (1793–1863), American politician and soldier
- Sam Howard (born 1993), American baseball player
- Sam Howell (born 2000), American football player
- Sam Huard (born 2002), American football player
- Sam Hubbard (born 1996), American football player
- Sam Huff (1934–2021), American football player
- Sam Huff (baseball) (born 1998), American baseball player
- Sam Hui (born 1948), Hong Kong musician, singer, songwriter and actor
- Sam Hunt (born 1984), American singer and songwriter

== I ==
- Sam F. Iacobellis (1929–2016), American engineer
- Sam Ibiam (1925–2015), Nigerian footballer
- Sam Iduri (1949–2023), Solomon Islands politician
- Sam Ehimigbai Ifidon (born 1941), Retired Nigerian Librarian and Administrator
- Sam Iles (born 1987), Australian rules footballer
- Sam Illo (born 2001), Irish rugby union player
- Sam Ingram (born 1985), Paralympic martial artist
- Sam Inwood (born 2005), Northern Irish-English footballer
- Sam Iorio (born 1998), American-Israeli basketball player
- Sam Irvin (born 1956), American film director
- Sam Irvin (rugby union), England international rugby union player
- Sam Irvine (1890–1959), Australian mail contractor
- Sam Irving (1893–1968), Northern Irish footballer-manager
- Sam Irwin-Hill (born 1990), Australian gridiron football player
- Sam Irwin (born 1992), Australian rugby league footballer
- Sam Isaacs (1845–1920), Australian stockman and farmer involved in ship rescue
- Sam Isemonger (born 1978), Australian rugby league footballer
- Sam Israel (1899–1994), American businessman
- Sam Iwry (1910–2004), Russian-American academic

== J ==
- Sam Jackson (footballer) (born 1998), Liberian footballer
- Sam Jaffe (1891–1984), American actor, teacher and engineer
- Sam Jaffe (producer) (1901–2000), American film producer, agent and studio executive
- Sam Johnson (1930–2020), American politician and U.S. Air Force officer and fighter pilot
- Sam Johnstone (born 1993), English footballer
- Sam E. Jonah (born 1949), Ghanaian businessman
- Sam Jones (disambiguation), multiple people, including
  - Sam Jones III (born 1983), American actor
  - Sam Jones (actor), Indian actor
  - Sam Jones (Alabama politician) (born 1947), American politician
  - Sam Jones (American football) (born 1996), American football player
  - Sam Jones (Australian footballer) (born 1974), Australian rules footballer
  - Sam Jones (Australian politician) (1923–1999), Australian politician
  - Sam Jones (baseball) (1925–1971), American baseball player
  - Sam Jones (basketball, born 1933) (1933–2021), American basketball player
  - Sam Jones (basketball, born 1978), American-Dutch basketball player and coach
  - Sam Jones (drag racer), American gasser drag racer
  - Sam Jones (footballer, born 1991) (born 1991), Footballer
  - Sam Jones (ice hockey) (born 1997), English ice hockey player
  - Sam Jones (musician) (1924–1981), American jazz double bassist, cellist, and composer
  - Sam Jones (photographer) (born 1966), American photographer and film director
  - Sam Jones (rugby union) (born 1991), English rugby union player
  - Sam Jones (Welsh footballer), Welsh footballer

== K ==
- Sam Kamara (born 1997), American football player
- Sam Kasiano (born 1990), New Zealand rugby player
- Sam Katz (born 1951), Canadian politician, mayor of Winnipeg
- Sam Katzman (1901–1973), American film producer and director
- Sam Keith (1921–2003), American author
- Sam Kendricks (born 1992), American track and field athlete
- Sam Kennedy (disambiguation), multiple people, including
  - Sam Kennedy (American football) (born 1964), American football player
  - Sam Kennedy (baseball executive) (born 1973), American baseball executive
  - Sam Kennedy (footballer, born 1881) (1881–1955), Scottish footballer
  - Sam Kennedy (footballer, born 1896) (1896–1963), English professional footballer
  - Sam Kennedy (footballer, born 1899) (born 1899), Scottish footballer
- Sam Kerr (born 1993), Australian football player
- Sam Kerr (born 1999), Scottish football player
- Sam Khan Ilkhani Zafaranlu (died 1866/67), leader of the Kurdish Zafaranlu tribe and ruler of the town of Quchan
- Sam Kieth (born 1963), American comic book writer and illustrator
- Sam Kinison (1953–1992), American stand-up comedian and actor
- Sam Knox (1910–1981), American football player
- Sam Satoru Kong (born 1959), American politician
- Sam Koch (born 1982), American football player

== L ==
- Sam Landry (born 2003), American softball player
- Sam Lanin (1891–1977), American jazz bandleader
- Sam LaPorta (born 2001), American football player
- Sam Leach (disambiguation), multiple people
- Sam Lee (disambiguation), multiple people, including
  - Sam Lee (actor) (born 1975), Hong Kong actor
  - Sam Lee (folk musician) (born 1980), Musical artist
  - Sam Lee (rugby union) (1871–1944), Rugby union player from Northern Ireland
  - Sam Lee (singer) (born 1973), Musical artist
  - Sam Lee (tennis) (1914–2012), American tennis player
- Sam Little (basketball) (1946–2006), American basketball player and coach
- Sam Little (golfer) (born 1975), English golfer and sports agent
- Sam Lloyd (1963–2020), American character actor and musician
- Sam Long (disambiguation), multiple people, including
  - Sam Long (baseball) (born 1995), American baseball player
  - Sam Long (footballer, born 1995), English footballer
  - Sam Long (footballer, born 2002), Scottish footballer
  - Sam Long (triathlete) (born 1995), American triathlete
- Sam LoPresti (1917–1984), American ice hockey goaltender
- Sam Low (born 1970), American businessman and politician from Washington State
- Sam Loxton (1921–2011), Australian cricketer, footballer and politician

== M ==
- Sam Mac, Australian radio and television personality
- Sam Macaroni (born 1975), American actor, film director, and writer
- Sam Maceo (1894–1951), Sicilian-American businessman and organized crime boss
- Sam Mackinnon, Australian basketball player
- Sam Manekshaw (1914–2008), Indian Army officer
- Sam Mangubat (born 1990), Filipino singer
- Sam Manning (disambiguation), multiple people
- Sam Match (1923–2010), American tennis player
- Sam Mayes (born 1994), Australian rules footballer
- Sam Mbah (1963–2014), Nigerian writer
- Sam Mbakwe (1929–2004), Nigerian politician
- Sam Mbulaiteye, Ugandan physician-scientist
- Sam McCullum (born 1952), American football player
- Sam McDowell (born 1943), American baseball pitcher
- Sam McIntosh (born 1990), Australian parathlete
- Sam McKendry (born 1989), New Zealand rugby player
- Sam Mele (1922–2017), American baseball player, manager, coach and scout
- Sam Mendes (born 1965), English stage and film director
- Sam Mesi, Chicago gangster.
- Sam Mewis (born 1992), American soccer player
- Sam Milby (born 1984), Filipino-American actor and singer
- Sam Millington (fl mid-1920s and 1930s), English footballer
- Sam Mirza (1517–1566/67), Safavid prince and poet in 16th-century Iran
- Sam Mitchell (disambiguation), multiple people, including
  - Sam Mitchell (basketball) (born 1963), American basketball player and coach
  - Sam Mitchell (Florida politician) (1929–2003), American politician
  - Sam Mitchell (footballer) (born 1982), Australian rules footballer
- Sam Mizrahi (born 1971), Iranian-born Canadian real estate developer
- Sam Moa (born 1986), Tongan-New Zealand rugby player
- Sam Moll (born 1992), American baseball player
- Sam Montgomery (born 1990), American football player
- Sam Moran (born 1978), Australian entertainer
- Sam Moskowitz (1920–1997), American science fiction writer, critic, and historian
- Sam Mustipher (born 1996), American football player
- Sam Myhrman (1912–1965), Swedish Air Force general
- Sam Mvimbi (born 1999), South African field hockey player

== N ==
- Sam Nachtigal (born 1962), American politician
- Sam Naffziger, American electrical engineer
- Sam Nahem (1915–2004), American baseball player
- Sam Naismith (born 1992), Australian rules footballer
- Sam Nakagama (1925–2006), Japanese-American businessman, economist and financial advisor
- Tricky Sam Nanton (1904–1946), American jazz trombonist
- Sam Napier (footballer) (born 1883), Irish footballer
- Fali Sam Nariman (1929–2024), Indian jurist
- Sam Narron (pitcher) (born 1981), American baseball player & coach
- Sam Narron (catcher) (1913–1996), American baseball player and coach
- Sam El Nasa (born 1984), Cambodian footballer
- Sam Naz, British news presenter
- Sam Nazarian (born 1975), American businessman
- Sam Nda-Isaiah (1962–2020), Chairman Leadership Newspaper, Nigerian politician
- Sam Neary (born 2002), British racing driver
- Sam Neel (1875–1947), American tennis player
- Sam Neill (1947–2026), New Zealand actor
- Sam Nelson (1896–1963), American film director
- Sam Neuman, American screenwriter and songwriter
- Sam Nevills (1925–2005), American gridiron football player
- Sam Newfield (1899–1964), American film director
- Sam Newman (born 1945), Australian rules football player
- Sam Newman (footballer, born 1901) (1901–1937), Australian rules footballer
- Sam Newsome (born 1965), American jazz musician
- Sam Nhlengethwa (born 1955), South African artist
- Sam Nicholl (1869–1937), Irish baseball player
- Sam Nichols (1829–1913), 4th Secretary of State of Washington
- Sam Nicholson (born 1995), Scottish footballer
- Sam Nicoresti, British comedian
- Sam Nikolajsen (born 1961), Danish speedway rider
- Sam Nivola (born 2003), British and American actor
- Sam Nixon (born 1986), English singer and television presenter
- Sam Nixon (rugby union) (born 1996), English rugby union player
- Sam Noakes (born 1997), English boxer
- Sam Nock (born 1996), NZ Maori rugby union player
- Sam Nogajski (born 1979), Australian cricket umpire
- Sam Nolan (1930–2024), Irish trade unionist
- Sam Nolutshungu (1945–1997), South African academic
- Sam Nombe (born 1998), English footballer
- Sam Norkin (1917–2011), American cartoonist
- Sam North (born 1960), English author
- Sam Northeast (born 1989), English cricketer
- Sam Norton-Knight (born 1983), Australian rugby union player
- Sam Noto (1930–2026), American jazz trumpeter
- Sam Nover (1941–2018), American sportscaster
- Sam Ntuli (1960–1991), South African activist and trade unionist
- Sam Ntulume, Ugandan businessman and corporate executive
- Sam Nuchia, American lawyer
- Sam Nujoma (1929–2025), President of Namibia from 1990 to 2005
- Sam Nujoma Jr. (born 1991), Namibian politician
- Sam Nunberg (born 1981), American political operative
- Sam van Nunen (born 2001), Dutch swimmer
- Sam Nunis (1903–1980), American auto racing promoter
- Sam Nunn (born 1938), American lawyer and politician
- Sam Nunn (rower) (born 1996), British rower
- Sam Nusum (born 1943), Bermudian footballer
- Sam Nyamweya (born 1953), Kenyan businessperson
- Sam Nzima (1934–2018), South African photographer

== O ==
- Sam O'Connor (born 1991), Australian politician
- Sam O'Connor (rugby union) (born 2001), Welsh rugby union player
- Sam O'Dea (born 1990), New Zealand beach volleyball player
- Sam O'Farrell (born 2005), Irish hurler
- Sam O'Reilly (born 2006), Canadian ice hockey player
- Sam O'Steen (1923–2000), American film editor and director
- Sam Obi (died 2021), Nigerian politician and pastor
- Sam Obst (born 1980), Australian rugby league footballer
- Sam Ochonma (born 1987), Nigerian film producer
- Sam Odaka (1929–2015), Ugandan politician and diplomat
- Sam Odom (1919–1977), American baseball player
- Sam Offord (born 1986), Australian artistic gymnast
- Sam Oh (born 1980), Filipino broadcaster
- Sam Ohuabunwa (born 1950), Nigerian pharmacist, politician and business executive
- Sam Ojebode (1945–2012), Nigerian footballer
- Sam Oji (1985–2021), English footballer
- Sam Ojuri (born 1990), American football player and coach
- Sam Okafor (born 1982), Nigerian footballer
- Sam Okoye (1980–2005), Nigerian footballer
- Sam Okuayinonu (born 1998), Liberian gridiron football player
- Sam Okudzeto (born 1935), Ghanaian politician
- Sam Okyere (born 1991), Television personality
- Sam Olajubutu (born 1983), American gridiron football player
- Sam Oldham (born 1993), British artistic gymnast
- Sam Olens (born 1957), Former Georgia Attorney General and University President
- Sam Olij (1900–1975), Dutch heavyweight boxer
- Sam Olver (born 1994), English rugby union player
- Sam Omatseye (born 1961), Nigerian writer
- Sam Ongeri, Kenyan politician
- Sam Onwuaso, Nigerian politician
- Sam Oomen (born 1995), Dutch cyclist
- Sam Oosterhoff (born 1997), Canadian politician
- Sam L. Orlich (1939–2025), American politician
- Sam Ormerod (1848–1906), English footballer, referee, and manager
- Sam Oropeza (born 1985), American mixed martial arts fighter
- Sam Osborne (footballer) (born 1999), English footballer
- Sam Osborne (racing driver) (born 1993), British former racing driver
- Sam Otada (born 1971), Ugandan politician
- Sam Otto (born 1992), English actor
- Sam Oud (born 1978), Dutch slalom canoeist
- Sam Outlaw (born 1982), American singer-songwriter
- Sam Owens, American musician
- Sam Oye, Nigerian pastor

== P ==
- Sam Paulescu (born 1984), American football punter
- Sam Peckinpah (1925–1984), American filmmaker and screenwriter
- Sam Perrett (born 1985), New Zealand rugby player
- Sam Perrin (1901–1998), American screenwriter
- Sam Phillips (record producer) (1923–2003), American record producer
- Sam Pinto (born 1989), Filipino actress, model, singer, and VJ
- Sam Pollock (1925–2007), Canadian sports executive
- Sam Posey (born 1944), American racecar driver and sports broadcast journalist
- Sam Prekop (born 1964), American rock/pop musician
- Sam Presti (born 1977), American basketball manager
- Sam C. Pointer Jr. (1934–2008), American attorney and judge

== Q ==
- Sam Qualiana (born 1986), American filmmaker and actor
- Sam Quek (born 1988), British field hockey player, and television presenter
- Sam Querrey (born 1987), American tennis player
- Sam Quinones (born 1958), American journalist
- Sam Quirke (born 2002), Irish hurler

== R ==
- Sam Raben (born 1997), American soccer player
- Sam Raimi (born 1959), American film director, producer, actor and writer
- Sam Rayburn (1882–1961), American politician from Texas
- Sam Register (born 1969), American television producer and businessman
- Sam Rice (1890–1974), American baseball pitcher and right fielder
- Sam Riegel (born 1976), American voice actor, writer and director
- Sam Rivers (bassist) (1977–2025), American bassist
- Sam Rivers (jazz musician) (1923–2011), American jazz musician and composer
- Sam Robards (born 1961), American actor
- Sam Roberts (disambiguation), multiple people, including
  - Sam Roberts (American football) (born 1998), American football player
  - Sam Roberts (journalist) (born 1947), American journalist
  - Sam Roberts (radio personality) (born 1983), American radio personality
  - Sam Roberts (singer-songwriter) (born 1974), Canadian singer-songwriter
- Sam Robertson (born 1985), Scottish actor
- Sam Rockwell (born 1968), American actor
- Sam Roddick (born 1971), British entrepreneur, founder of Coco de Mer
- Sam Rogers (disambiguation), multiple people, including
  - Sam Rogers (Canadian football) (born 1973), American gridiron football player
  - Sam Rogers (fullback) (born 1995), American football player and coach
  - Sam Rogers (linebacker) (born 1970), American football player
  - Sam Rogers (soccer) (born 1999), American soccer player
- Sam Rosen (actor), American actor and writer
- Sam Rosen (comics) (1922–1992), American comic book letterer
- Sam Rosen (sportscaster) (born 1947), American sportscaster
- Sam Rothschild (1899–1987), Canadian ice hockey player
- Sam Roush (born 2003), American football player
- Sam van Rooy (born1985), Belgian politician for Vlaams Belang, author, blogger, and former professional cyclist
- Sam Russell (disambiguation), multiple people, including
  - Sam Russell (footballer, born 1900) (1900–1959), Irish footballer
  - Sam Russell (footballer, born 1982) (born 1982), English footballer and coach
- Sam Ryan (born 1969), American sportscaster

== S ==
- Sam Samore, American artist
- Sam Sarin (1936–2020), Croatian fisherman and bluefin tuna entrepreneur
- Sam Schachter (born 1990), Canadian beach volleyball player
- Sam Schwartzstein (born 1989), American football player
- Sam Scott, New Zealand director
- Sam Sebo (1906–1933), American football player
- Sam Selman (born 1990), American baseball player
- Sam Shaw (disambiguation), multiple people, including
  - Sam Shaw (baseball) (1864–1947), American baseball player
  - Sam Shaw (footballer) (born 1991), Australian rules footballer
  - Sam Shaw (sound editor) (1946–2024), American sound editor
- Sam Sheedy (born 1988), English professional boxer
- Sam Shendi Egyptian-born British sculptor
- Sam Shepard (1943–2017), American playwright, actor, author, screenwriter, and director
- Sam Shepherd (disambiguation), multiple people
- Sam Shilton (born 1978), English footballer
- Sam S. Shubert (1878–1905), American producer and theatre owner and operator
- Sam Simmons (disambiguation), multiple people, including
  - Sam Simmons (American football) (born 1979), American football player
  - Sam Simmons (comedian) (born 1977), Australian comedian and actor
- Sam Simon (1955–2015), American television producer and writer, developer of The Simpsons
- Sam Singer (1912–2001), American animator and animation producer
- Sam Singer (basketball) (born 1995), American-Israeli basketball player
- Sam Sloma (born 1982), English football player
- Sam Sloman (born 1997), American football player
- Sam Smith (disambiguation), multiple people, including
  - Sam Smith (born 1992), English singer and songwriter
  - Sam Smith (actor) (born 1989), English actor, born 1989
  - Sam Smith (American politician) (1922–1995), American politician
  - Sam Smith (artist) (born 1980), Australian filmmaker and artist
  - Sam Smith (Australian politician) (1857–1916), Australian politician and union official
  - Sam Smith (basketball, born 1943) (1943–2022), American basketball player
  - Sam Smith (basketball, born 1955), American basketball player
  - Sam Smith (businesswoman) (born 1974), British business executive
  - Sam Smith (comedian), New Zealand comedian and author
  - Sam Smith (footballer, born 1904) (1904–1988), English footballer
  - Sam Smith (footballer, born 1909) (1909–1994), English footballer
  - Sam Smith (footballer, born 1998), English footballer
  - Sam Smith (journalist) (born 1937), American journalist
  - Sam Smith (painter) (1918–1999), American artist
  - Sam Smith (psychologist) (1929–2012), Canadian psychologist
  - Sam Smith (rugby league) (1926–1989), British international rugby league footballer
  - Sam Smith (rugby union) (born 1990), English rugby union player
  - Sam Smith (sportswriter) (born 1948), American sportswriter
  - Sam Smith (toy-maker) (1908–1983), Toy-maker
- Sam Snead (1912–2002), American golfer
- Sam Sneed (born 1968), American producer and rapper
- Sam Sodje (born 1979), Nigerian footballer
- Sam Sparro (born 1982), Australian singer, songwriter, and producer
- Sam Spiegel (1901–1985), Austrian-born American independent film producer
- Sam Sullivan (born 1959), Canadian politician
- Sam Sweeney (born 1989), English folk musician

== T ==
- Sam Tamburo (1926–1998), American football player
- Sam Tanenhaus (born 1955), American historian, biographer, and journalist
- Sam Taylor-Johnson (born 1967), English filmmaker, photographer and visual artist
- Sam Tecklenburg (born 1997), American football player
- Sam Thaiday (born 1985), Australian rugby footballer
- Sam Thomas (disambiguation), multiple people, including
  - Sam Thomas (basketball) (born 1999), American basketball player
  - Sam Thomas (campaigner) (born 1986), English eating disorder activist
  - Sam Thomas (jockey) (born 1984), Welsh jockey
  - Sam Thomas Winnall, the birthname of Sam Winnall (born 1991), English footballer
- Sam Tillen (born 1985), English footballer
- Sam Torrance (born 1953), Scottish golfer
- Sam Trammell (born 1969), American actor

== U ==
- Sam Uffindell (born 1983), New Zealand politician
- Sam Ukala (1948–2021), Nigerian playwright
- Sam Ulano (1920–2014), American jazz musician
- Sam Underhill (born 1996), American-born English rugby union player
- Sam Underwood (born 1987), English actor
- Sam Urzetta (1926–2011), American golfer
- Sam Uskiw (1933-2011), Canadian politician
- Sam Uzochukwu (born 1940), Nigerian academic and expert on Igbo oral poetry

== V ==
- Sam Vacanti (1922–1981), American football player
- Sam M. Vadalabene (1914–1994), American politician
- Sam Vaghar (born 1986), American social entrepreneur
- Sam Vaisrub (1906–1980), Canadian physician and medical editor
- Sam Vaka (born 1992), New Zealand rugby union footballer
- Sam Vaknin (born 1961), Israeli author
- Sam Valcke (born 1992), Belgian footballer
- Sam Valentine (1934–1985), American football player
- Sam Vandervelde (born 1971), American mathematician
- Sam Vanni (1908–1992), Finnish painter
- Sam Nariman Variava (born 1940), Indian judge
- Sam van der Ven (born 1989), Dutch field hockey player
- Sam Venuto (1927–2014), American football player
- Sam Verlinden (born 1997), New Zealand singer and actor
- Sam Vernon (born 1987), American visual artist
- Sam Verrills (born 1999), Australian rugby league footballer
- Sam Verzosa (born 1982), Businessman and politician
- Sam Vesty (born 1981), England international rugby union player & coach
- Sam Vincent (disambiguation), multiple people, including
  - Sam Vincent (born 1971), Canadian voice actor
  - Sam Vincent (basketball) (born 1963), American basketball player and coach
- Sam Vines (born 1999), American soccer player
- Sam Virgo (born 1987), Australian rules footballer
- Sam Vishal (born 1999), Indian vocalist
- Sam de Visser (born 2003), Belgian Paralympic swimmer
- Sam Viviano (born 1953), American cartoonist
- Sam Voinoff (1907–1989), American football and golf coach
- Sam Vokes (born 1989), Wales international footballer
- Sam Voutas, Australian actor and filmmaker

== W ==
- Sam Walton (1918–1992), American businessman and entrepreneur
- Sam Walton (American football) (1943–2002), American football player
- Sam Wang (disambiguation), multiple people, including
  - Sam Wang (actor) (born 1976), Taiwanese actor, singer and model
  - Sam Wang (neuroscientist) (born 1967), American professor, neuroscientist, psephologist and author
- Sam Warburg (born 1983), American tennis player
- Sam Warner (1887–1927), American film producer, co-founder and CEO of Warner Bros. Studios
- Sam Waterston (born 1940), American actor, producer and director
- Sam Watson (disambiguation), multiple people, including
  - Sam Watson (climber) (born 2006), American professional speed climber
  - Sam Watson (equestrian) (born 1985), Irish eventer
  - Sam Watson (political activist) (1952–2019), Indigenous Australian activist
  - Sam Watson (politician) (born 1978), American politician from Georgia
  - Sam Watson (trade unionist) (1898–1967), English trade unionist and Labour party activist
- Sam Watters (born 1970), American songwriter and record producer
- Sam Weaver (1909–1985), English footballer
- Sam Weaver (baseball) (1855–1914), American baseball player
- Sam Webb (disambiguation), multiple people, including
  - Sam Webb (American football) (born 1998), American football player
  - Sam Webb (architect), British architect
  - Sam Webb (boxer) (born 1981), English boxer
  - Sam Webb (communist) (born 1945), American activist and political leader
  - Sam Webb (model) (born 1989), British model
- Sam Webster (disambiguation), multiple people, including
  - Sam Webster (cyclist) (born 1991), New Zealand cyclist
  - Sam Webster (writer), American occult writer
- Sam Weir (disambiguation), multiple people
- Sam Weller (disambiguation), multiple people, including
  - Sam Weller (cricketer) (born 1994), English cricketer
  - Sam Weller (journalist) (born 1967), American journalist and author
  - Sam Weller Widdowson (1851–1927), English sportsman
- Sam Welsford (born 1996), Australian racing cyclist
- Sam Whiteman (disambiguation), multiple people, including
  - Sam Whiteman (American football) (born 1901), American football player
  - Sam Whiteman (Australian cricketer) (born 1992), Australian cricketer
  - Sam Whiteman (New Zealand cricketer) (born 1982), New Zealand cricketer
- Sam Wiglusz (born 1999), American football player
- Sam Wilder (disambiguation), multiple people, including
  - Sam Wilder (American football) (born 1982), American football player
- Sam Williams (disambiguation), multiple people, including
  - Sam Williams (baseball) (1922–2007), American baseball player
  - Sam Williams (basketball, born 1924) (1924–2012), American college basketball coach
  - Sam Williams (basketball, born 1945) (born 1945), American basketball player
  - Sam Williams (basketball, born 1959) (born 1959), American basketball player
  - Sam Williams (defensive back) (born 1952), American football player
  - Sam Williams (defensive end, born 1999) (born 1999), American football player
  - Sam Williams (defensive lineman) (1931–2013), American football player
  - Sam Williams (footballer) (born 1987), English footballer
  - Sam Williams (linebacker) (born 1980), American football player
  - Sam Williams (rugby league) (born 1991), Australian rugby league player, born 1991
  - Sam Williams (rugby union) (born 1862), English rugby union player (1862-unknown)
  - Sam Williams (singer) (born 1997), American singer-songwriter
  - Sam Williams (soccer) (born 2005), American soccer player
- Sam Winnall (born 1991), English footballer
- Sam Witwer (born 1977), American actor
- Sam Wood (1883–1949), American film director and producer
- Sam Worthington (born 1976), Australian actor
- Sam Wright (disambiguation), multiple people, including
  - Sam Wright (Australian footballer) (born 1990), Australian rules footballer
  - Sam Wright (baseball) (1848–1928), American baseball player
  - Sam Wright (English footballer) (born 1997), English footballer
  - Sam Wright (priest) (born 1959), Irish priest and dean
- Sam Wyly (born 1934), American entrepreneur, businessman, philanthropist, and campaign contributor

== Y ==
- Sam Y.G. (born 1984), Filipino radio and television personality
- Sam Yagan (born 1977), American Internet entrepreneur
- Sam Yahel (born 1971), American jazz pianist and organist
- Sam Pee Yalley, Ghanaian lawyer and government official
- Sam Yarbrough (born 1984), American racing driver
- Sam Yari (born 1986), Iranian fashion photographer
- Sam Yasgur (1942–2016), American lawyer
- Sam Yates (born 1983), British director
- Sam Yawayawa (born 1998), Fijian rugby union player
- Sam Ybarra (1945–1982), American Vietnam War commando
- Sam Yingling (born 1980), American politician
- Sam Yip (born 1987), Hong Kong politician
- Sam Yoon (born 1970), American politician
- Sam Yorty (1909–1998), American politician
- Sam Youkilis (born 1993), American photographer and filmmaker
- Sam Young (American football) (born 1987), American football player
- Sam Young (basketball) (born 1985), American basketball player
- Sam Young (English cricketer) (born 2000), English cricketer
- Sam Younger (born 1951), British media and charity manager
- Sam Yuchtman (1910–1979), Jewish-Canadian radio host

== Z ==
- Sam Khan Ilkhani Zafaranlu (died 1866/67), Kurdish tribe leader
- Sam Zajac (born 1989), English ice hockey player
- Sam H. Zakhem (born 1935), American politician
- Sam Zalta, American musician and performance artist
- Sam Zamarripa (born 1952), American politician
- Sam Y. Zamrik (1932–2026), Syrian-American engineer
- Sam Zandamela, South African politician
- Sam Zell (1941–2023), American businessman
- Sam Zeller, American neutrino physicist
- Sam Zeloof, American semiconductor engineer autodidact
- Sam Zemurray (1877–1961), American businessman
- Sam Zien (born 1959), American TV personality and cook
- Sam Zimbalist (1904–1958), American film producer and editor
- Sam Zniber (born 1969), French radio executive
- Sam Zoldak (1918–1966), American baseball player
- Sam Zolotow (1899–1993), American theatre critic
- Sam Zurier, American attorney and politician

== Fictional characters ==
- Long Sam, American comic strip character
- Pajama Sam, protagonist of the adventure series "Pajama Sam"
- Yosemite Sam and Sam Sheepdog, two Looney Tunes characters
- Maggie & Sam, two Woody Woodpecker characters
- Sam Alexander, Marvel Comics character also known as Nova
- Samantha Carter, in the TV show Stargate SG-1
- Samuel "Sam" Drake, from Uncharted 4: A Thief's End
- Sam Eagle, from The Muppet Show
- Sam Evans, in the TV series Glee
- Sam Fisher, protagonist of the Splinter Cell video game series
- Sam Flagg, in the TV series M*A*S*H
- Sam Flynn, protagonist of the film Tron: Legacy
- Samwise Gamgee, in J. R. R. Tolkien's legendarium
- Sam Guthrie, Marvel Comics character also known as Cannonball
- Samantha "Sam" Jacinto, a character from the 2026 Philippine television drama action comedy Coco Martin's Sigabo
- Sam Malone, on the American sitcom television series Cheers
- Sam Puckett, in the TV show iCarly and Sam & Cat
- Sam Seaborn, on the TV series The West Wing
- Sam Spade, protagonist in the novel and film The Maltese Falcon
- Sam Sullivan, in The 5th Wave
- Sam (Totally Spies), in the French animated show Totally Spies!
- Samwell Tarly, in the TV show Game of Thrones
- Sam Uley, in the novel and film Twilight
- Sam Vimes, in Terry Pratchett's Discworld series
- Sam Wilson (Marvel Cinematic Universe), the primary film/television adaptation of the character
- Sam Winchester, one of the two protagonists of the American drama television series Supernatural
- Sam Witwicky, protagonist of the first three Transformers films
- Toucan Sam, cartoon mascot for Kellogg's Froot Loops breakfast cereal
- Uncle Sam, a personification of the United States government

== See also ==
- Sam (disambiguation)
- Sam (surname)
- Sammy
