= Chris Boadi-Mensah =

Ghanaian insurance executive and public official

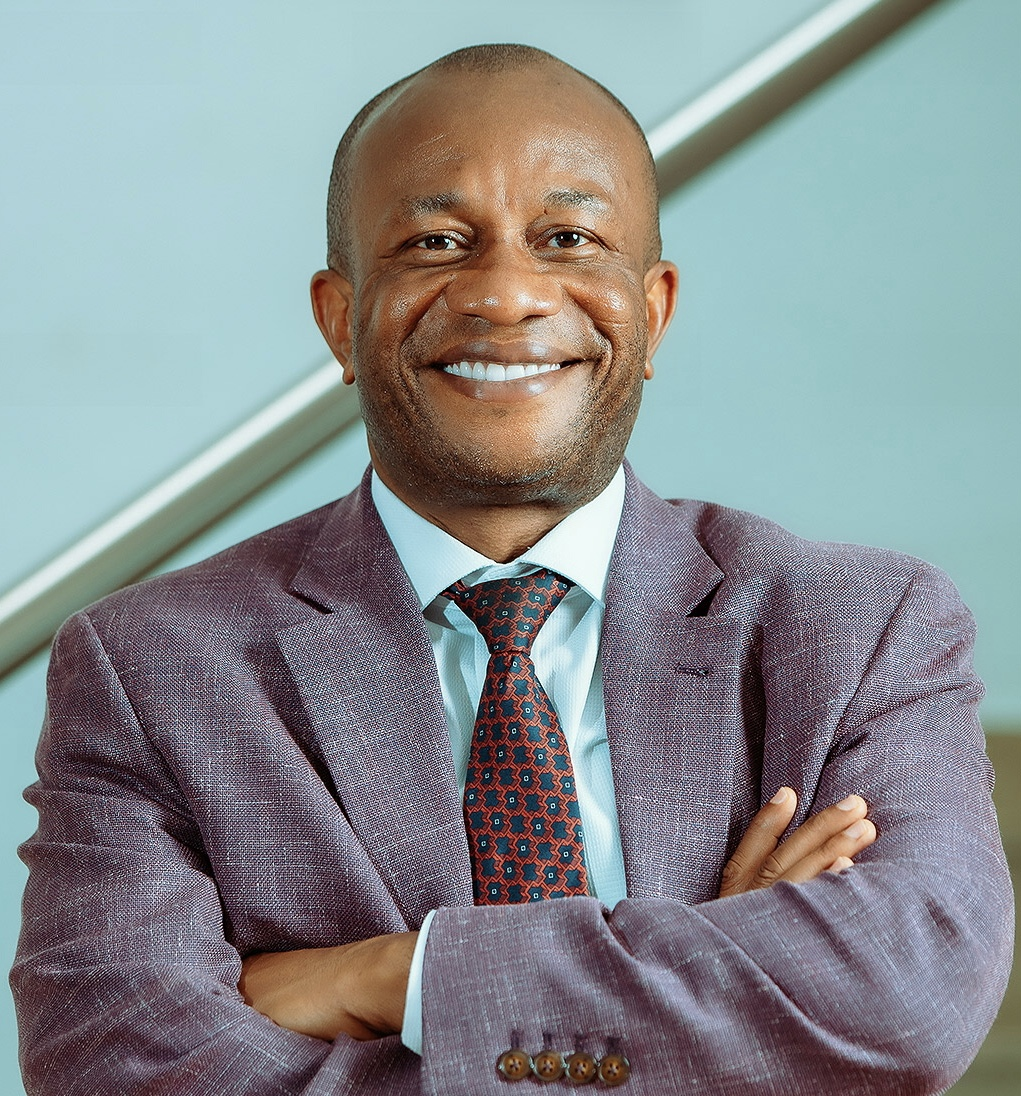

Chief Executive Officer of the National Pensions Regulatory Authority
- Incumbent
- Assumed office 23 January 2025
- President: John Dramani Mahama
- Deputy: Victor Azuma Mejida
- Preceded by: John Kwaning Mbroh

Chairman of the Governing Board of the National Insurance Commission
- Incumbent
- Assumed office May 2025
- Preceded by: Abenaa Kessewaa Brown

Personal details
- Born: Christopher Boadi-Mensah; December 12, 1975 (age 50)
- Party: National Democratic Congress
- Education: Ghana Institute of Management and Public Administration; Netherlands Business School; West African Insurance Institute
- Occupation: Insurance executive, public official

Christopher Boadi-Mensah (born 12 December 1975) is a Ghanaian insurance executive and public official. He has been Chief Executive Officer of the National Pensions Regulatory Authority since January 2025. He is also Chairman of the governing board of the National Insurance Commission and a member of the Executive Committee of the International Organisation of Pension Supervisors.

== Early life and education ==
Boadi-Mensah received his secondary education at Prempeh College. He undertook professional insurance training at the Chartered Insurance Institute (United Kingdom), qualifying as a Chartered Insurance Practitioner, and also holds a Diploma in Insurance and Risk Management from the West African Insurance Institute (WAII). He later earned an MBA in Finance and Risk Management from the Netherlands Business School and a Master of Science degree in Economic Policy Management from the Ghana Institute of Management and Public Administration (GIMPA).

He is a Chartered Insurer and a member of the Chartered Insurance Institute (United Kingdom) and the Chartered Insurance Institute of Ghana.

== Private work ==
Boadi-Mensah has built a career in Ghana’s insurance and financial services sectors, spanning insurance brokerage, and risk management.

Between 2013 and 2014, he worked as a Risk Manager at Provident Life Assurance, where his responsibilities included insurance risk assessment and compliance-related functions. He was employed in 2005 at Provident Life as an insurance underwriter.

From February 2015 to May 2018, he was Managing Director of Irisk Insurance Brokers (also styled Irisk Management), an insurance brokerage firm registered with the National Insurance Commission. Industry records list him among the firm’s senior executives during this period.

From 2018 to 2022, Boadi-Mensah was Managing Director of Serene Insurance Company.

From 2022, he was Chief Executive Officer of Byllwych Insurance Brokers. Media reports at the time of his appointment to the National Pensions Regulatory Authority described him as heading the brokerage firm prior to transitioning into public service.

== Government official ==
=== National Pensions Regulatory Authority ===
In January 2025, Boadi-Mensah was appointed Acting Chief Executive Officer of the NPRA by President John Dramani Mahama. In this role, he oversees the regulation and supervision of pension schemes in Ghana, with a focus on governance, compliance, and retirement security.

During his tenure, the authority has pursued initiatives aimed at expanding pension education and financial literacy, including proposals to introduce basic pension education in schools and technical institutions, and programmes to improve pension participation among informal sector workers.

Boadi-Mensah has also publicly advocated for pension system reforms, including the use of technology to enhance compliance monitoring and discussions on adjusting the statutory retirement age in response to demographic and economic pressures. He also advocated for Ghanaian companies to create more investor-friendly environments for long-term partnerships with the public.

=== National Insurance Commission ===
In May 2025, Boadi-Mensah was sworn in as Chairman of the governing board of the National Insurance Commission, where he provides policy and regulatory oversight for Ghana’s insurance industry.

=== International roles ===
In November 2025, he was elected to the Executive Committee of the International Organisation of Pension Supervisors for the 2026–2027 term, representing Ghana within the OECD-linked global pension oversight network.

== Parliamentary campaigns ==
Boadi-Mensah contested the National Democratic Congress parliamentary primary in the Ahafo Ano South East Constituency in the Ashanti Region ahead of the 2016 general election. He won the party’s parliamentary primary and became its parliamentary candidate for the constituency.

He was defeated by the New Patriotic Party candidate in the 2016 Ghanaian general election.

== Controversies ==
In April 2026, Chris Boadi-Mensah was accused by the Minority in parliament of doubling his salary in February 2025, right after he assumed office as the Chief Executive Officer of the National Pensions Regulatory Authority. The National Pensions Regulatory Authority later responded to the claim as false since their outgoing board had approved of the increment even before Chris Boadi-Mensah was appointed.
