= Sam Webb =

Sam or Samuel Webb(e) may refer to:

== Politicians ==
- Sam Webb (communist) (born 1945), American Communist Party activist and politician
- Samuel R. Webb (1848–1933), New Zealand businessman and politician
- Samuel F. Webb (1853–1920), American politician from Arizona
- Samuel Webb (assemblyman) of 46th New York State Legislature
- Samuel Webb, 1758 High Sheriff of Bristol

== Sportspeople ==
- Sam Webb (American football) (born 1998), American professional football player
- Sam Webb (boxer) (born 1981), British professional boxer
- Red Webb (born Samuel Henry Webb, 1924–1996)), American baseball player

== Others ==
- Samuel Blachley Webb (1753–1807), American Revolutionary War officer
- Samuel Webb, associated with the 1838 building of Pennsylvania Hall (Philadelphia)
- Sam Webb (architect) (1937–2022), British architect
- Sam Webb (model) (born 1986), British male model

== See also ==
- Samuel Webbe (1740–1816), English composer
- Samuel Webbe the younger (1768–1843), his son, English music teacher and composer
- Samuel Webb, actor of Drew Sharp in Dead Freight
- Samuel Webb of the Skeleton Canyon shootout
- Samuel B. Webb School in Wethersfield, Connecticut
