= Samuel Wilder =

Samuel Wilder may refer to:

- Billy Wilder (1906–2002), filmmaker whose birth name was Samuel Wilder
- Sam Wilder (American football) (born 1933), American football player
- Samuel Gardner Wilder (1831–1888), shipping magnate in Hawaii
