= Samuel Day =

Samuel, Sammy or Sam Day may refer to:

- Samuel Day (sportsman) (1878–1950), English cricketer and footballer, known as Sammy Day
- Samuel S. Day (1808–1871), Canadian-born American Baptist missionary
- Samuel T. Day (1838–1877), American physician, plantation owner and politician
- Sam Day (jockey) (1802–1866), English jockey and uncle of
- Sam Day Jr. (1818–1838), English jockey
- Sam Day (Australian footballer) (born 1992), Australian rules footballer
- Sammy Day, the title character of the Belgium comic series Sammy
- Sam Day (rugby league) (born 1994), rugby league footballer
