= Sam Hill =

Sam or Samuel Hill may refer to:

- Sam Hill (euphemism), an American English slang phrase for "the devil" or "hell" personified

== People ==
=== Sports ===
- Sam H. Hill (1898–1978), American football coach and sports figure
- Sam Hill (baseball) (1926–1977), American Negro leagues baseball player
- Sam Hill (cyclist) (born 1985), Australian downhill mountain bike racer
- Sam Hill (rugby union) (born 1993), rugby union player
- Sam Hill (high jumper), winner of the 1998 USA Indoor Track and Field Championships
- Sam Hill (hammer thrower), 1923 NCAA Championships hammer throw runner-up for the Illinois Fighting Illini track and field team

=== Other people ===
- Samuel Hill (1691–1758), English MP for Lichfield
- Samuel Hill (priest) (died 1716), Anglican priest
- Samuel Hill (engraver) (c. 1765–c. 1809), engraver who worked in Boston, Massachusetts
- Samuel Hill (sea captain) (1777–1825), American merchant sea captain and adventurer
- Samuel W Hill (1815–1889), American surveyor, geologist and mining developer
- Samuel Hill (VC) (1826–1863), Irish recipient of the Victoria Cross
- Samuel Hill (1857–1931), railroad businessman and builder of the Maryhill Museum and Peace Arch
- Samuel B. Hill (Washington politician) (1875–1958), U.S. Representative from the state of Washington
- Samuel B. Hill (Ohio politician) (born 1862), educator and state lawmaker
- Sam Hill (director), American television director and producer

== See also ==
- Samantha Hill
- Sam Hill House (disambiguation)
- Sam Hill Memorial Bridge, across Columbia River, between the U.S. states of Oregon and Washington
- Giv'at Shmuel ('Samuel's Hill'), a city in the Center District of Israel
