= Infectious Agents and Cancer =

Peer-reviewed medical journal

- Discipline: Oncology, microbiology
- Language: English
- Edited by: Franco M. Buonaguro, Sam M. Mbulaiteye, Maria Lina Tornesello

Publication details
- History: 2006-present
- Publisher: BioMed Central
- Impact factor: 3.698 (2021)

Standard abbreviations
- ISO 4: Infect. Agents Cancer

Indexing
- ISSN: 1750-9378
- LCCN: 2006265208
- OCLC no.: 969744514

Links
- Journal homepage; Online access

Infectious Agents and Cancer is a peer-reviewed open access medical journal covering the relationship between infections and cancer. It was established in 2006 and is published by BioMed Central. It is affiliated with the African Organization for Research and Training in Cancer. The editors-in-chief are Franco M. Buonaguro (Istituto Nazionale Tumori), Sam M. Mbulaiteye (National Cancer Institute) and Maria Lina Tornesello (Istituto Nazionale Tumori). According to the Journal Citation Reports, the journal has a 2021 impact factor of 3.698.
