= Samuel Wright =

Samuel or Sam Wright may refer to:

== Government ==
- Samuel G. Wright (1781–1845), United States Representative from New Jersey
- Samuel C. Wright (1842–1906), American Civil War soldier
- Samuel Wright (Medal of Honor), (1828–1918), American Civil War soldier
- Samuel T. Wright III (born 1955), Associate Justice of the Kentucky Supreme Court
- Samuel Thomas Wright (1887–1948), Canadian wholesale merchant and political figure in Ontario
- Samuel D. Wright (1925–1998), American politician in New York

== Sports ==
- Sam Wright (Australian footballer) (born 1990), Australian rules footballer
- Sam Wright (baseball) (1848–1928), American baseball shortstop
- Samuel Wright (English cricketer) (1869–1947), English cricketer
- Samuel Wright Sr. (1812–1877), English-American cricketer
- Samuel Wright (Jamaican cricketer) (born 1933), Jamaican cricketer
- Sam Wright (English footballer) (born 1997), English footballer

== Others ==
- Samuel Wright (nonconformist) (1683–1746), dissenting divine
- Sam Wright (priest) (born 1959), Dean of Connor since 2016
- Samuel E. Wright (1946–2021), American actor and singer
- Samuel Hart Wright (1825–1905), farmer, astronomer, botanist, teacher, and almanac editor
