= Sam Thomas =

Sam Thomas may refer to:

- Sam Thomas (campaigner) (born 1986), campaigner for men living with eating disorders
- Sam Thomas (jockey) (born 1984), Welsh jockey
- Sam Fan Thomas (born 1952), Cameroonian musician
- Sam Thomas (basketball) (born 1999), professional women's basketball player

== See also ==
- Samuel Thomas (disambiguation)
