= Sam Whiteman =

Sam Whiteman may refer to:

- Sam Whiteman (American football) (1901–?), American football player for the Chicago Bulls
- Sam Whiteman (Australian cricketer) (born 1992), Australian cricketer for Western Australia
- Sam Whiteman (New Zealand cricketer) (born 1982), New Zealand cricketer for Auckland
