= National Pensions Regulatory Authority =

Government agency in Ghana

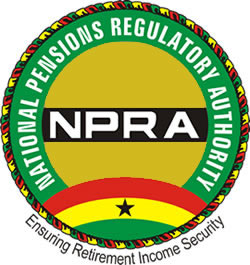
- .
- Industry: Pensions
- Headquarters: Ridge,, Accra, Ghana
- Number of locations: Kumasi, Tamale
- Key people: Dr.Nii Kwaku Sowah Chairman; Chris Boadi-Mensah (CEO)
- Owner: Government of Ghana
- Website: www.npra.gov.gh

The National Pensions Regulatory Authority (NPRA) is a Government of Ghana statutory agency responsible for the regulation and policy development of pensions administration in Ghana. The NPRA was established by the National Pensions Act 2008, (Act 766) to regulate and monitor the operations of the three-tier pension scheme and ensure effective administration of all pensions in the country.

== Guidelines ==
1. Guidelines on Investment of Tiers 2 and 3 Pension Scheme Funds
2. Guidelines for Registration of Pension Custodian
3. Guidelines for Registration of Pension Fund Managers
4. Guidelines for Licensing of Corporate Trustees
5. Guidelines for Licensing of Individual Trustees
6. Guidelines for the payment of monthly contributions to registered pension schemes
7. Guidelines for the Registration of Expatriate (Foreign) Workers under ACT 766

== Board members ==
- Nii Kwaku Sowah - Chairman (as of December 2013)
- Kofi Anokye Owusu-Darko - CEO (as of July 2015)

== Past Chief Executive Officers ==
- Laud Senanu
- Sam Pee Yalley
