= Sam Wilder =

Sam Wilder may refer to:

- Sam Wilder (American football) (born 1933), American football player
- Sam Wilder, fictional character from the American TV series Charmed
- Samuel Gardner Wilder (1831–1888), shipping magnate in Hawaii
