= Sam Bass =

Sam Bass may refer to:

- Sam Bass (outlaw) (1851–1878), American train robber and outlaw
- Sam Bass (wrestler) (1935–1976), American professional wrestler and manager
- Sam Bass (politician) (1944–2018), Australian politician
- Sam Bass (artist) (1961–2019), American sports artist
- Sam Bass Hollow, a valley in Texas
- Sam Bass, the founder of the Canadian drugstore chain London Drugs
- Samuel Bass (abolitionist) (1807–1853), Canadian-American abolitionist who helped Solomon Northup attain freedom
- Sam Bass, mayor of Skagway, Alaska
