= Samuel Rogers (disambiguation) =

Samuel Rogers (1763–1855) was an English poet.

Samuel Rogers may also refer to:

- Samuel Augustus Rogers (1840–1911), Irish-born merchant and political figure in British Columbia
- Samuel Baldwyn Rogers (1778–1863), British metallurgical chemist and pamphleteer known as "Iron-Bottom" Rogers
- Samuel F. Rogers (1834–1905), American sailor and Medal of Honor recipient
- Samuel St. George Rogers (1832–1880), Confederate politician

== See also ==
- Sam Rogers (disambiguation)
- Samuel Rodgers (1894–1970), unionist politician in Northern Ireland
- Samuel U. Rodgers (1917–1999), American physician, educator, and public health advocate
- Samuel R. Rodgers (1798–1866), Tennessee state legislator and judge
