= Samuel Webster =

Samuel Webster may refer to:

- Samuel R. Webster (1854–1948), member of the Wisconsin State Assembly
- Samuel Webster (1813–1872), founder of Webster's Brewery

== See also ==
- Sam Webster (disambiguation)
