= Samuel Collins =

Samuel or Samantha or Sam Collins may refer to:

- Samuel Collins (theologian) (1576–1651), English clergyman and academic
- Samuel Collins (physician, born 1617) (1617–1685), English physician
- Samuel Collins (physician, born 1618) (1618–1710), English anatomist and physician
- Samuel Collins (physician, born 1619) (1619–1670), English physician
- Samuel Collins (artist) (1735–1768), British artist
- Samuel W. Collins (1802–1870), American axe manufacturer
- Samuel Collins (1802–1878), English poet and radical
- Sam Collins (music hall) (1825–1865), English music hall comedian and proprietor
- Samuel Collins (Pennsylvania politician) (1850–1927), American politician
- Sam Collins (musician) (1887–1949), American blues singer and guitarist
- Sam L. Collins (1895–1965), American politician
- Samuel Collins (physicist) (1898–1984), physicist at MIT
- Samuel Collins (Maine politician) (1923–2012), American lawyer, jurist and politician from Maine
- Sam Forse Collins (1928–2021), member of the Texas House of Representatives
- Sam Collins (footballer, born 1977), English professional footballer
- Sam Collins (chess player) (born 1982), Irish chess player
- Sam Collins (footballer, born 1989), English professional footballer
- Sam Collins (Australian footballer) (born 1994), Australian rules footballer for Gold Coast, formerly for Fremantle

== See also ==
- Sam Collins Day, public holiday
- Sammy Collins (1923–1998), English footballer
