= Sam Weller =

Sam Weller may refer to:

- Sam Weller (character), fictional character in The Pickwick Papers by Charles Dickens
- Sam Weller (journalist) (born 1967), American journalist and author
- Sam Weller (racehorse), competitor who failed to finish in the 1842 Grand National
- Sam Weller (cricketer) (born 1994), English cricketer

== See also ==
- Samuel A. Weller (1851–1925), American pioneer pottery manufacturer
- Samuel Weller, or, The Pickwickians, an 1837 comedy play
