= Sam Fletcher =

Sam or Samuel Fletcher may refer to:

- Sam Fletcher (baseball) (1881–?), pitcher in Major League Baseball
- Sam Fletcher (soccer) (1890–1972), English footballer
- Sam Fletcher (footballer, born 1900) (1900-1953), English footballer, see List of Bury F.C. players (1–24 appearances)
- Sam Fletcher (singer) (1934–1989), American singer in the 1950s and 1960s
- Samuel Fletcher (merchant), English solicitor
- Samuel Fletcher (politician) (died 1950), member of the Legislative Assembly of Manitoba

== See also ==
- Samantha Fletcher, British novelist
