= Laud Senanu =

Ghanaian government official

Laud Senanu is a Ghanaian Government Official and the former chief executive officer of the National Pensions Regulatory Authority. He replaced Sam Pee Yalley who was nominated by President John Mahama for an ambassadorial appointment. Prior to his appointment, Senanu was the head of Benefits Division of the Social Security and National Insurance Trust.
