= Samuel Thomas =

Samuel Thomas may refer to:

- Buzz Thomas (Samuel Thomas, born 1969), politician from the U.S. state of Michigan
- Samuel Bath Thomas (1855–1919), founder of Thomas' English muffins and bagels
- Samuel Bell Thomas (1868–1943), New York lawyer
- Samuel Thomas (priest) (1627–1693), English nonjuring clergyman and controversialist
- Samuel Russell Thomas (1840–1903), American capitalist and Union Army general
- Samuel Benjamin Thomas, Sierra Leonean entrepreneur and philanthropist
- Samuel Joyce Thomas, British barrister, colonial judge and politician

== See also ==
- Sam Thomas (disambiguation)
