= Sam Aboyeji =

Nigerian minister and denominational leader (born 1960)

- General Overseer
- Church: Foursquare Gospel Church in Nigeria
- Installed: 17 November 2019
- Predecessor: Felix Meduoye

Personal details
- Born: 26 December 1960 (age 65)
- Citizenship: Nigeria
- Spouse: Olabisi Aboyeji
- Children: Iyanuoluwa, Iyinoluwa Aboyeji, Ifeoluwa, Ireoluwa
- Occupation: Pastor, theologian, church administrator
- Education: University of Ilorin; University of Lagos; LIFE Theological Seminary

Sam Aboyeji (born 26 December 1960) is a Nigerian Pentecostal minister, theologian, and church administrator. He is the 5th General Overseer of the Foursquare Gospel Church in Nigeria. Prior to his election to the denomination's highest office in 2019, he held several leadership positions including District Overseer, Regional Coordinator, and member of the National Executive Council.

== Early life, education, and career ==
Aboyeji earned a Bachelor of Science (Hons) degree in economics from the University of Ilorin. He later obtained an Master of Business Administration in Financial management and Accounting from the University of Lagos.

Before entering full-time ministry, he built a professional career in Nigeria's financial and energy sectors. He worked as a Stockbroker and subsequently as an Investment analyst and community relations coordinator with the Shell Petroleum Development Company (SPDC).

To prepare for pastoral ministry, Aboyeji attended LIFE Theological Seminary, Ikorodu Ikorodu, where he completed a bachelor's degree in Theology. He has also pursued professional development, becoming a Fellow of the Chartered Institute of Stockbrokers and a member of the Institute of Chartered Mediators and Conciliators (ICMC).

Aboyeji left the corporate sector in March 2010 to enter full-time Christian ministry.

== Ministry career ==
=== Early ministry and rise in Foursquare Gospel Church ===
Aboyeji joined the Foursquare Gospel Church in Nigeria in 1988 and was ordained as a minister in 2001. In the early years of his ministry, he served as Senior Pastor at the Olu of Warri Palace and participated actively in local church leadership and evangelism initiatives.

He retired from his position in the Oil and Natural Gas Corporation in March 2010 to commit fully to pastoral work.

Aboyeji's advancement within Foursquare Nigeria followed a steady progression through multiple leadership levels. He served as Senior Pastor and later as District Overseer, overseeing several churches within designated administrative zones.

He was appointed Warri District Overseer in 2006, a position in which he was recognized as the church's best District Overseer for three consecutive years. In 2011, he became the Mid-West Region Coordinator.

During this period, he was also appointed to national bodies within Foursquare Nigeria, including the Board of Home and Foreign Missions and the National Executive Council. These roles involved participation in national-level strategic decision-making and reflected recognition of his leadership beyond the districts and regions he supervised.

=== Leadership as General Overseer ===
Aboyeji was elected as the 5th General Overseer of the Foursquare Gospel Church in Nigeria in July 2019 during the denomination's special delegates convention. He succeeded Rev. Felix Meduoye, who had completed two terms in office.

He was re-elected in 2024 for a second five-year term, receiving 1,931 votes out of 1,979 delegates (97.6 percent) at a special convention held at the Ajebo Campground.

Upon assuming office in 2019, Aboyeji outlined an agenda focused on evangelism, church planting, youth engagement, ministerial development, and administrative strengthening. His administration emphasised mission work in urban, rural, and riverine communities, including the Riverine/Hinterland Churches Enlargement Scheme (RHCHES). He also reaffirmed the denomination's emphasis on the “fourfold gospel” of Jesus as Saviour, Baptiser with the Holy Spirit, Healer, and Soon-Coming King.

Youth involvement formed a significant part of his stated priorities, with calls for expanded participation of young people across the church's ministries. His administration also referenced a framework described as “In-reach, Outreach and NextGen,” used to guide programme direction and resource allocation.

During Aboyeji's tenure, the church has undertaken several institutional projects. These include youth ministry reforms and adjustments to pastoral licensing processes to increase opportunities for younger ministers.

In the area of Community health services, the church commissioned an upgraded hospital facility at its Ajebo Camp during the 70th Annual Convention, continuing earlier healthcare outreach to Ajebo and surrounding communities.

His administration has also sustained the Annual Foursquare Public lecture series, which addresses Public policy and Social issues; the 12th edition focused on Poverty alleviation and Economic development. As part of the denomination's 70th-anniversary activities, the church announced a programme which included measures related to ministers’ welfare and retirement support.

As General Overseer, Aboyeji represents Foursquare Nigeria in national Christian associations, ministerial councils, and interdenominational forums. His administration has engaged in public commentary on national matters, including Economic policy. In 2025, he participated in events such as the Foursquare Ministers and Leaders Conference, where he and other senior officials addressed topics related to ministerial ethics and the future direction of the church.

== Awards and recognition ==
Aboyeji received an honorary Doctor of Divinity degree from the Crowther Graduate Theological Seminary, an affiliate of Ajayi Crowther University, during its 11th convocation ceremony in Abeokuta, Ogun State.

== Personal life ==
Aboyeji is married to Olabisi Aboyeji, who is also a minister in the Foursquare Gospel Church in Nigeria. They have four children: Iyanuoluwa, Iyinoluwa Aboyeji, Ifeoluwa, and Ireoluwa.
