= Sam Vaghar =

American social entrepreneur (born 1986)

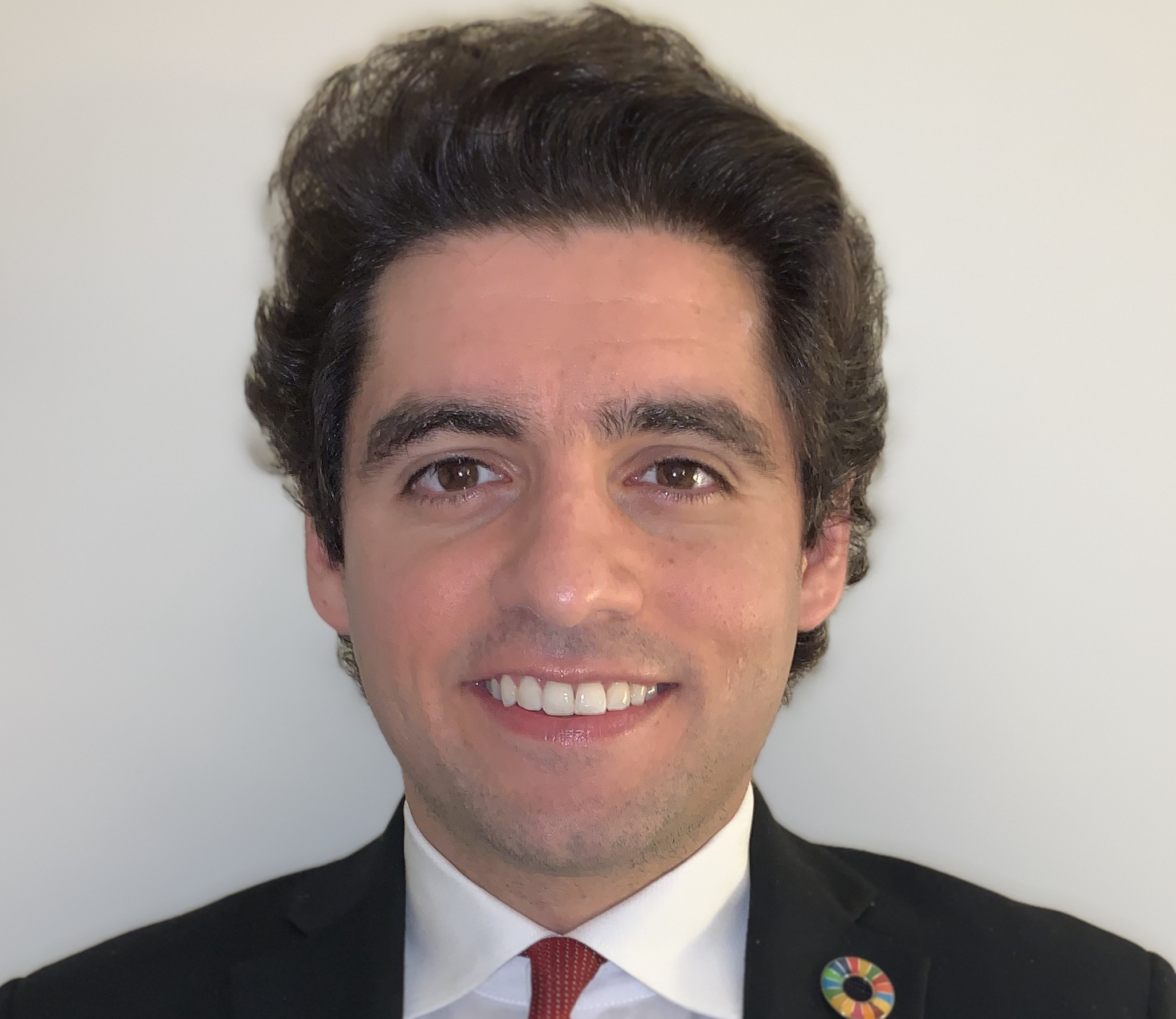
- Born: August 19, 1986 (age 40); Birmingham, England
- Citizenship: American
- Education: Brandeis University
- Occupations: Executive Director, Millennium Campus Network

Sam Vaghar (born August 19, 1986) is an American social entrepreneur and Executive Director and co-founder of the Millennium Campus Network.

== Early life ==
Sam Vaghar was born in Birmingham, England, and raised in Newton, Massachusetts. As a child growing up, he was diagnosed with Crohn's disease. A trip in his teenage years to Havana, Cuba exposed him to the challenges of poverty. After enrolling at Brandeis University, Vaghar began to engage in social activism, initially organizing a bi-partisan bus trip to President Bush's inauguration in 2005. During this time, Vaghar read Mountains Beyond Mountains about the work of Dr. Paul Farmer and Partners in Health. Vaghar then read The End of Poverty by economist Dr. Jeffrey Sachs.

As a college sophomore, Vaghar cold-called Dr. Sachs' office and met with his staff two days later in New York City. Back on campus, Vaghar and friend Seth Werfel later co-founded the Millennium Campus Network in the summer of 2007.

Vaghar graduated with a Bachelor of Arts in International & Global Studies from Brandeis University in 2008.

== Millennium Campus Network ==
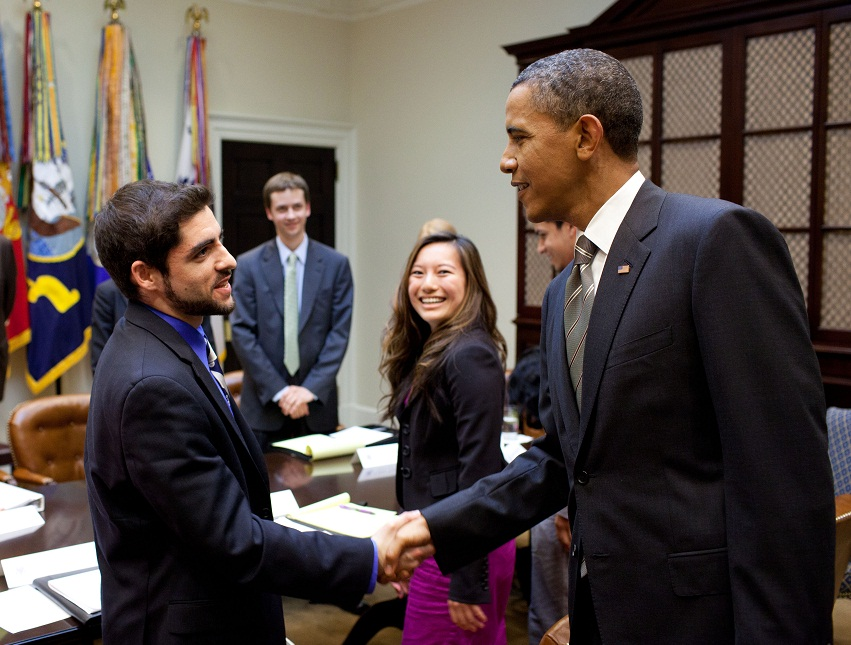
Vaghar meeting Obama in a Youth Initiative De-Brief

Vaghar serves as Executive Director of the Millennium Campus Network (MCN). In this capacity, Vaghar engages with numerous MCN allies, including sponsors like Microsoft and The Jenzabar Foundation as well as MCN Advisors including Jeffrey Sachs and Paul Farmer. His primary responsibilities center on fundraising and outreach. Vaghar has represented the MCN in engaging with numerous global leaders including President Barack Obama and Secretary of State John Kerry.

In addition to his role with MCN, Vaghar serves as an Advisor to the Executive Director of United Nations Women as a member of her Civil Society Advisory Group.

== Awards and recognition ==
Honorary Doctorate from Monmouth College and 2020 Commencement Speaker.

Gleitsman Fellow at the Center for Public Leadership, John F. Kennedy School of Government at Harvard University.

Honorary Doctorate from Becker College and 2018 Honors Convocation Distinguished Speaker

Profiled in The Boston Globe and Fast Company.

2013 Commencement Speaker, Lynn University

Selected to the 2012 list of the "Top 99 most influential foreign policy leaders under the age of 33" by The Diplomatic Courier and Young Professionals in Foreign Policy

Selected as one of ten young American leaders from across the nation to share perspectives with President Barack Obama in the White House in June 2011

Invited by the US State Department as Featured Speaker across Sarajevo, Bosnia and Herzegovina, September 2011

2010 Social Entrepreneurs of the Year, awarded to the MCN (accepted by Will Herberich and Sam Vaghar) by The Jenzabar Foundation
