= West African Insurance Institute =

West African Insurance Institute is a sub regional insurance education centre in Banjul, The Gambia. The institute trains and certifies insurers from West Africa and offers them certificates. It was established in 1973.
