= Samantha Hill =

Samantha Hill may refer to:

- Samantha Hill (actress), Canadian actress and singer
- Samantha Hill (water polo) (born 1992), water polo player
- Sami Hill, Canadian basketball player
