= Sam Pee Yalley =

Ghanaian lawyer and government official

Yalley at his desk

Sam Pee Yalley (died 6 April 2025) was a Ghanaian lawyer and government official.

== Education ==
Yalley held degrees from University of Ghana, Central University College and Ghana Institute of Management and Public Administration.

== Political career ==
Yalley served as the deputy chief executive officer of the National Pensions Regulatory Authority. He also served as the authority's Acting chief executive officer till 2014 till he handed over to Laud Senanu. In March 2014 it was announced that he had been nominated by President John Mahama for an ambassadorial appointment.

== Death ==
Yalley died after a brief illness on 6 April 2025
