= Sam Hill House =

Sam Hill House may refer to:

- Sam Hill House (Seattle), in Seattle, Washington, U.S.
- Sam Hill House (Marshall, Michigan), listed on the Michigan State historic registry in Calhoun County
- Samuel E. Hill House, in Hartford, Kentucky, U.S., listed on the National Register of Historic Places
