= Sam Weir =

Sam Weir may refer to:

- Sam Weir (Freaks and Geeks), a character on the American TV series Freaks and Geeks
- Sammy Weir, former head coach of the UCF Knights college football program
