= Sam Manning =

Sam Manning may refer to:

- Sam Manning (musician) (1899–1960), calypsonian from Trinidad
- Sam Manning (One Life to Live), a fictional character in the American soap opera One Life to Live
- Samuel Manning (1841–1933), Mayor of Christchurch, New Zealand
