= Sam Rogers =

Sam Rogers may refer to:

- Sam Rogers (Canadian football) (born 1973), Canadian football defensive back
- Sam Rogers (linebacker) (born 1970), American football linebacker
- Sam Rogers (fullback) (born 1995), American football fullback
- Sam Rogers (soccer) (born 1999), American soccer player
- Sam Rogers (sailor), American World Champion sailor

== See also ==
- Samuel Rogers (disambiguation)
