= Sam George =

Sam or Samuel George may refer to:

- Sam George (surfer), surfer, writer, director and screenwriter
- Sam George (activist) (1952–2009), Canadian native rights activist
- Sam George (musician) (1942–1982), lead singer and drummer of The Capitols
- Sam George (soccer) (born 1970), U.S. soccer midfielder
- Sam Nartey George, Ghanaian politician
- Samantha George, who uses pen name Sam George, academic and writer
- Samuel George (1795–1873), Onondaga Indian chief
