= Sam Bass Hollow =

Coordinates: 32°47′44″N 98°33′29″W

Sam Bass Hollow is a valley in Palo Pinto County, Texas, in the United States.

The valley bears the name of Sam Bass (1851–1878), an American train robber and outlaw who hid there from the law.
