= Sam Cooper (American football) =

American football player (1909–1998)

No. 24
- Position: Tackle

Personal information
- Born: February 1, 1909; Venetia, Pennsylvania, U.S.
- Died: August 22, 1998 (aged 89); Green Tree, Pennsylvania, U.S.
- Listed height: 6 ft 0 in (1.83 m)
- Listed weight: 200 lb (91 kg)

Career information
- High school: Mars (PA)
- College: Geneva (1929–1932)

Career history
- Pittsburgh Pirates (1933)
- Stats at Pro Football Reference

Samuel VanVoorhis Cooper (February 1, 1909 – August 22, 1998) was an American professional football tackle who played one season in the National Football League (NFL) with the Pittsburgh Pirates. He played college football at Geneva College.

== Early life and college ==
Samuel VanVoorhis Cooper was born on February 1, 1909, in Venetia, Pennsylvania. He attended Monongahela High School and graduated from Mars High School in Mars, Pennsylvania.

Cooper played college football for the Geneva Golden Tornadoes of Geneva College from 1929 to 1932.

== Professional career ==
Cooper signed with the Pittsburgh Pirates of the National Football League on August 1, 1933. He played in one game for the Pirates as a tackle during the team's inaugural 1933 season. He was released in 1933.

== Personal life ==
After playing in the NFL, Cooper went on to become superintendent of a boys' home, a teacher, coach, and principal. He also worked at a steel company and operated a farm with his wife.

He died on August 22, 1998, in Green Tree, Pennsylvania.
