= Sam Leach =

Sam Leach may refer to:

- Sam Leach (artist) (born 1973), Australian artist
- Sam Leach (Coronation Street), a character in the British soap opera Coronation Street
- Sam Leach (promoter), see Aldershot#The Beatles in Aldershot)
- Samuel Leech, sailor
- Sam Leitch (1927–1980) British journalist and television presenter
