= Foursquare Gospel Church in Nigeria =

Church in Nigeria

The Foursquare Gospel Church in Nigeria, sometimes referred to as Foursquare Gospel Church, Yaba, is an evangelical Pentecostal Christian denomination founded on November 4, 1954 by Rev. H.J. Curtis & Mrs. Faye Curtis and their two sons. The organization is one of the largest churches in Nigeria, and claims 2064 branches in Nigeria. The church is affiliated with the International Church of the Foursquare Gospel, headquartered in Los Angeles, California, United States.

The founding fathers of the Foursquare Gospel Church in Nigeria were 1st, Rev James Abayomi Boyejo, Rev Odunaike Samuel Olusegun and Rev Friday Chinyere Osuwa.

The church's national headquarters are located at 62/66 Akinwunmi street, Yaba, Lagos. The church is headed by the General Overseer and Senior Pastor who is Rev. Sam Aboyeji.
