= Sam Vaisrub =

Canadian physician and medical editor (1906–1980)

Sam Vaisrub (1906–1980), generally published as Samuel Vaisrub, was a Russian-born physician and medical editor whose career linked Canadian clinical practice with American medical journalism. He practiced in rural Saskatchewan, later worked as a cardiologist in Winnipeg, and in 1965 moved to Chicago to become a senior editor of JAMA; from 1976 he was also an associate editor of Archives of Internal Medicine. He was known for witty, historically allusive editorials and for the 1977 book Medicine's Metaphors: Messages & Menaces.

== Early life and medical career ==
Born in Russia in 1906, Vaisrub immigrated to Canada at the age of seventeen and graduated from the University of Manitoba College of Medicine in 1932. He then established a general practice in rural Saskatchewan, where he remained until 1941. During the Second World War he enlisted in the Royal Canadian Army Medical Corps and served in Italy; a later medical-humanities account quoted regimental history as praising his work at the Melfa River in 1944 after he treated more than 100 wounded in a 24-hour period while himself wounded. After the war he trained in cardiology in England and returned to Winnipeg as a cardiologist.

== Editorial career ==
In 1955 Vaisrub became editor of the Manitoba Medical Review, and bibliographic records of Canadian health-science periodicals list him as editor for volumes 35 through 44 of the journal. A contemporary review of Medicine's Metaphors described him as having moved from clinical practice into medical editing and writing and noted his growing distinction as senior editor of JAMA and associate editor of Archives of Internal Medicine. Chest later described his editorial mission as an effort to place modern medical beliefs in historical and contemporary perspective, and emphasized his recurring arguments for clinical judgment, linguistic precision, and compassion in patient care. In 1980 he introduced JAMA's A Piece of My Mind feature; a 2020 retrospective in the journal noted that the first essay in the series was written by Vaisrub under the pen name "Sam Vee".

== Writings and reception ==
Vaisrub wrote hundreds of editorials between his years at the Manitoba Medical Review and JAMA, and later commentators singled out his humor, breadth of reading, and interest in the humanities. His 1977 book Medicine's Metaphors: Messages & Menaces examined medical language through examples drawn from warfare, classical mythology, religion, literature, and etymology. The book was reviewed in Archives of Internal Medicine, and it continued to be discussed in later medical-humanities writing as a characteristic example of Vaisrub's editorial style and intellectual range.
