= Sam Simmons =

Sam or Samuel Simmon[d]s may refer to:

- Sam Simmons (American football) (born 1979), former NFL and AFL wide receiver
- Sam Simmons (comedian) (born 1977), Australian comedian
- Sam Simmonds (film editor), British film editor
- Sam Simmonds (rugby union) (born 1994), English rugby union player
- Samuel Simmons (printer) (1640–1687), English printer
- Samuel Simmons (actor) (1777?–1819), English actor
- Samuel Foart Simmons (1750–1813), British physician

== See also ==
- Samuel Simons, Connecticut politician
