= Sam Harding =

Sam Harding may refer to:

- Sam Harding (rugby union) (born 1980), New Zealand rugby union footballer
- Sam Harding (athlete) (born 1991), Australian Paralympic athlete
- Sam Harding (rugby union) (born 2006), English rugby union player
