= Sam Jackson (footballer) =

Liberian footballer (born 1998)

Sam N Jackson
Personal information
- Full name: Sam N Jackson
- Date of birth: October 13, 1998 (age 28)
- Place of birth: Monsterrado County, Liberia
- Height: 6 ft 1 in (1.85 m)
- Position: Forward

Team information
- Current team: LISCR FC
- Number: 7

Youth career
- 2010: Determiner FC
- 2012–2013: Capitol Hill FC

Senior career*
Years	Team	Apps	(Gls)
2014–2017	Barrack Young Controllers FC II	23	(10)
2017–2018	Barrack Young Controllers FC	12	(3)
2018–	LISCR FC	26	(6)

International career^{‡}
2019–	Liberia	7	(0)
- * Club domestic league appearances and goals ‡ National team caps and goals as of 1 January 2020

Sam N Jackson (born 13 October 1998) is a Liberian footballer who plays as a forward for Liberian club LISCR FC.

== Early career ==
Born in Monrovia, Liberia, Sam Jackson started playing football in his local community, ELWA where he caught the eyes of several community football teams. He joined Joy in the ELWA third division league. While playing for Joy, he was scouted to play for Nimba County in the 2013-14 Liberia National County Meet. Jackson played a starring role in helping Nimba County reach the final of the 2013-14 Liberia National County Meet before losing to Grand Bassa 2-1. He finished as the tournament top scorer.

== Barrack Young Controllers FC II ==
After the 2013-14 Liberia National County Meet, Sam Jackson signed with second division club, Barrack Young Controllers FC II which is the feeder team of Barrack Young Controllers FC. He helped the club win the second division twice and one Liberian FA Cup title as he helped Barrack Young Controllers II qualify for the 2016 CAF Confederations Cup where they played against Moroccan side, Kwakab Athletic Club of Marrakech. After a 3-0 defeat in Morocco, he helped grab a 2-0 win at home as they bowed out on a 3-2 aggregate.

== Barrack Young Controllers FC ==
In 2017, he was promoted to Barrack Young Controllers FC. Immediately after being promoted, he made the club's squad for their CAF Champions League team against Horoya FCof Guinea. He made seven appearances for Barrack Young Controllers FC before moving to LISCR FC in 2018.

== LISCR FC ==
After three years with Barrack Young Controllers FC, Sam Jackson crossed over to LISCR FC. He made his debut for LISCR FC in a 1-0 win over USM Bel Abbes of Algeria in the 2018-19 CAF Confederation Cup preliminary round second leg. Jackson first season with LISCR FC ended fruitful as he helped the club win the 2019 Liberia FA Cup. He finished his debut season as the highest assist player in the Liberia First division with 15 assist and four assists in the Liberia FA Cup.

== Liberia U20 ==
In 2014, he made his debut for Liberia U-20 national team against Gambia in the 2015 African U20 Cup of Nations Qualifier. Liberia qualified to the second round of the qualifiers after winning a protest against Gambia for fielding overage players and were paired against Ivory Coast in the second round. Jackson played in both home and away fixtures as Liberia U20 bowed out on a 2-1 aggregate.

His adventure with the national U-20 continued on April 3, 2016 when he represented the Junior Lone Star in the 2017 CAF AFCON U20 qualifying games against Guinea U-20. The fast-moving attacker played in the home and away fixtures that saw Liberia bowing out on a 2-1 aggregate.

He would go on to help Liberia U-20 finished as runners-up in the 2018 WAFU U-20 Nations Cup. He played all of Liberia's games in the tournament including the final which Liberia U-20 bowed to a 2-1 defeat to The Gambia U-20.

== Liberia ==
In 2018, he made his debut on July 21 in Liberia goalless draw with Sierra Leone. He played for Liberia in a friendly game away at Equatorial Guinea. He also played for Liberia in the 2020 CHAN qualifiers against Senegal.
