= Sam Ahn =

South Korean businessman (born 1981)

Ahn Sang-il
- 안상일
- Born: 1981; South Korea
- Education: Seoul National University
- Occupations: Businessman; investor
- Years active: 2014–

Ahn Sang-il (Korean: 안상일; born 1981), known also as Samuel Ahn, is a South Korean businessman and investor. He is founder and former CEO of Hyperconnect, the developer of Azar, which was acquired by Match Group in 2021 for $1.7 billion. He is a venture partner at Altos Ventures.

== Early life and education ==
Ahn was born in South Korea. He graduated from Seoul National University with a degree in materials engineering. During college, he attempted multiple business ventures before starting Hyperconnect in 2014.

== Career ==
In 2014, Ahn founded Hyperconnect with Jung Kang-sik, a friend from Seoul National University's Student Ventures Club, and Eddie Yong (Yong Hyeon-taek). The company developed the video chat platform Azar, and within one month of release had generated 2.3 million won in revenue.

By 2019, Azar had crossed 400 million downloads. Ahn stepped down as CEO in 2023 and became Chief Innovation Officer of Match Group's Asia division.

In 2021, Hyperconnect was acquired by Match Group in for $1.73 billion.

In 2025, Ahn Joined Silicon Valley-based Altos Ventures as a partner.
