= Sam Vincent (disambiguation) =

Sam Vincent (born 1971), is a Canadian voice actor.

Sam(uel) Vincent is also the name of:

- Sam Vincent (basketball) (born 1963), American basketball player and former coach
- Jonathan Brackley and Sam Vincent, co-creators of the TV series Humans
- Sam Vincent, character in Black Light (novel) and Pale Horse Coming
- Sam Vincent, runner who participated in athletics at the 2013 Canada Summer Games
- Samuel Vincent, British naval captain, involved in the action of August 1702 during the War of the Spanish Succession
- Sam Vincent, author of Blood & Guts
