= Sam Watson =

Sam Watson or Samuel Watson may refer to:

== Arts ==
- Samuel Watson (sculptor) (1662–1715), sculptor in wood and stone
- Samuel Wagan Watson (born 1972), Aboriginal Australian poet
- Sam Watson (political activist) (1952–2019), Aboriginal Australian novelist, filmmaker and political activist
- Krizz Kaliko (born 1974), American rapper, singer and voice actor

== Sport ==
- Sam Watson, 1966 Irish winner of Fitchburg Longsjo Classic bicycle race
- Sam Watson (climber) (born 2006), American speed climber
- Samuel Watson (cyclist) (born 2001), English cyclist
- Sam Watson (equestrian) (born 1985), Irish equestrian

== Other people ==
- Sam Watson (politician) (born 1978), US politician
- Sam Watson (trade unionist) (1898–1967), English coalminers' leader
- Samuel Watson (horologist) (fl. c. 1687–c. 1710), Sheriff of Coventry and manufacturer of the first stopwatch
- Samuel C. Watson (1832–1892), U.S. druggist, doctor, and civic leader
- Samuel E. Watson (died 1847), U.S. Marine Corps officer
