= Sam Iwry =

Russian-American academic (1910–2004)

Samuel Iwry (December 25, 1910 – May 8, 2004) was a Russian-American academic and Hebrew expert. In the late 1940s, he and his mentor William Foxwell Albright gained acclaim for dating the Dead Sea Scrolls to the times of Roman antiquity. He was described as "one of the world's leading Hebrew scholars and an authority on the Dead Sea Scrolls".

== Early life ==
Irwy was born on December 25, 1910, in Bialystock, then in the Russian Empire. According to his family history, Irwy is a direct descendant of the Baal Shem Tov.

He completed a traditional yeshiva education, receiving a diploma from the Vilna Rabbinical School and Teachers' Seminary in 1931. In 1937, he received a master's degree from the Higher Institute for Judaic Studies in Warsaw.

After the Nazi invasion of Poland in 1939, Irwy became a leader in the resistance movement. He fled to Lithuania, where Iwry was one of thousands of Jews to whom Japanese diplomat Chiune Sugihara issued visas to flee Europe via Japanese territory, arriving to Kobe, Japan, and then Shanghai, China, in 1941.

David Ben-Gurion appointed Irwy as the Jewish Agency's representative for the Far East, responsible for negotiating with the British to allow thousands of Jews to emigrate to Mandatory Palestine. Irwy was captured by Japanese occupation forces, imprisoned, and tortured.

In 1947, the couple immigrated to the United States.

== Academic career ==
Iwry was a graduate student at Johns Hopkins University studying under biblical scholar William Foxwell Albright. For a seminar course, Iwry wrote a paper theorizing that the Dead Sea Scrolls were more than 2,000 years old based on his analysis of the Hebrew of the manuscripts. In 1947, the Dead Sea Scrolls were discovered in Judea. Iwry's deep knowledge of ancient, rabbinic, and modern Hebrew helped a team under Albright to determine that the scrolls were authentic documents from Roman antiquity. Despite early skepticism from other scholars, carbon dating later confirmed Albright and Irwy's claims in April 1991, the same month Iwry retired from Johns Hopkins and assumed emeritus status.

Iwry earned his doctorate from Johns Hopkins University in 1951 and joined the school's faculty that same year. He was on the faculty of Johns Hopkins for 40 years until his retirement in 1991. From 1948 to 1955, he was also a full-time professor of literature and a dean at the Baltimore Hebrew University.

== Legacy ==
In 1986, Samuel Iwry Lectureship in Hebraic Studies at Johns Hopkins University was endowed. The Blum-Iwry Professorship in Near Eastern Studies at the school followed in 2002.

== Personal life ==
Iwry married to Nina in 1946. She was a hospital administrator who managed to have Irwy sent to a hospital after his imprisonment by the Japanese. The couple had one son. Irwy died of a stroke in Baltimore on May 8, 2004.
