= Sam Youkilis =

American photographer and filmmaker (born 1993)

- Born: 1993; New York City, United States
- Education: Bard College
- Known for: Photography

Sam Youkilis (born in 1993) is an American photographer and filmmaker. Known for his work with iPhone photography and video, particularly on Instagram, his work has been described as "a generous indexing of everyday life". Youkilis's photography captures everyday moments and universal human behaviors, with a strong focus on food and cultural traditions, predominantly in Europe, particularly Italy.

== Early life and education ==
Youkilis was born in New York City in 1993. Raised in Lower Manhattan, his father owned two restaurants while he was growing up, and he worked in them during his adolescent years. He began taking pictures as a teenager after receiving 35mm SLR camera as a gift, carrying it everywhere and capturing scenes like subway graffiti with his friends. He studied photography at Bard College under the tutelage of Stephen Shore. Facing difficulty finding paid photography work after graduating, he started offering to shoot for free for restaurants while also working as a bartender, selling wine, and serving.

After graduating in 2016, Youkilis discovered Instagram's Stories feature. He initially posted carefully curated content on his grid but found the story feature to be a more suitable space for sharing free-form, diary-like observations. He used this feature to showcase step-by-step cultural practices and thematic videos set in specific locations. He saved the money he earned from waiting tables in Manhattan to relocate to Mexico in 2017. Following that, he received a grant to journey through South America by bus, starting from Colombia and ending in Argentina.

== Photography ==
Since 2017, Youkilis has traveled extensively, documenting his experiences with an iPhone on his Instagram page. That year, he began documenting everyday life in Umbria. His short, vertical videos showcase various cultural practices, such as mochi-making in Nara, Japan and olive oil harvesting in Umbria, Italy as well as everyday scenes like the stray cats of Greece. Youkilis experienced a significant advancement in his work with the introduction of Instagram's vertical "stories" format. This format, ideal for creating "micro-videos," allowed him to capture small fragments of reality that blur the line between still and moving images. He has over 900,000 followers as of April 2026. Aperture Magazine credits him as one of the first artists to develop a visual language uniquely suited to this new medium, similar to the impact of photography on print magazines, and BBC has recognized him for seemingly pioneering a new form of narrative storytelling, describing his work as "a study of humanity that blurs the line between travel photography, voyeurism and anthropology, with each video revealing a fleeting glimpse of a place and time".

Youkilis describes his process as that of a flâneur, walking up to 15 miles a day to observe people and absorb the details of a place.

Youkilis draws inspiration from film, particularly the works of Italian filmmakers Pier Paolo Pasolini and Federico Fellini, which shape his idea of an older Italy. He has stated that food, restaurants, and ingredients, along with their origins, stories, and means of production, have consistently played a central role in guiding his travels. Italy plays a central role in Youkilis' photography. He is drawn to shooting the generation of Italians that he believes embodies a disappearing way of life, and has acknowledged an "obsession" with Italian food, traditions, and people, stating that much of his work is a genuine expression of appreciation for these aspects of the country.

=== Somewhere 2017-2023 ===
Youkilis' work from 2017 to 2023 was compiled into his first book, Somewhere 2017 – 2023, which consists of 528 pages of stills, published in 2023 by Loose Joints. In an interview with Vogue, he stated that he felt the need to publish the photo book in order to expand beyond Instagram, viewing his work as more than just "content" tailored for the platform. In creating the book, Youkilis utilized his archive of iPhone video work, which spanned from the project's beginning to its development. He describes the book as a comprehensive amalgamation of his work up to that point. The process included delving into the archive to identify themes and repetitions. Metadata from his phone’s photo library was used to create themes based on the time of day (e.g., “7:07 a.m.” or “12:33 p.m.”), color (such as a diptych featuring a woman's fire-engine-red swimsuit alongside the sun-kissed skin of a Mediterranean vacationer), and human behavior (like “gestures of romance”). Somewhere loosely follows the arc of a day around the world, starting with dawn breaking in Mexico City, and ending with the last light in Essaouira, Morocco. The photos retain the 9:16 phone format. The book includes essays written by David Campany, Matt Goulding, and Lou Stoppard. According to Youkilis, the title reflects the ambiguity of place in his work, which captures the world's uniqueness across borders. The Face described the photo book as being "broken down into themed chapters that read like a mixtape of the Mediterranean lifestyle’s greatest hits". Wallpaper* characterized it as a "visual exploration of the world" and noted Youkilis' attention to composition, color, chiaroscuro, and framing as "speaking to his deep affinity for the photographic medium, elevating his work beyond mere snapshots".

== Personal life ==
As of November 2023, Youkilis was based between New York and Italy, where he owns a home in a village in Umbria.

== Publications ==
- Youkilis, Sam (November 2023). Somewhere 2017-2023. Loose Joints. ISBN 978-1-912719-49-5.
