= Sam Wang =

Sam Wang may refer to:

- Sam Wang (neuroscientist), American neuroscientist and founder of the Princeton Election Consortium
- Sam Wang (actor) (born 1976), Taiwanese actor, singer, and model
