= Sam Yari =

Iranian fashion photographer (born 1986)

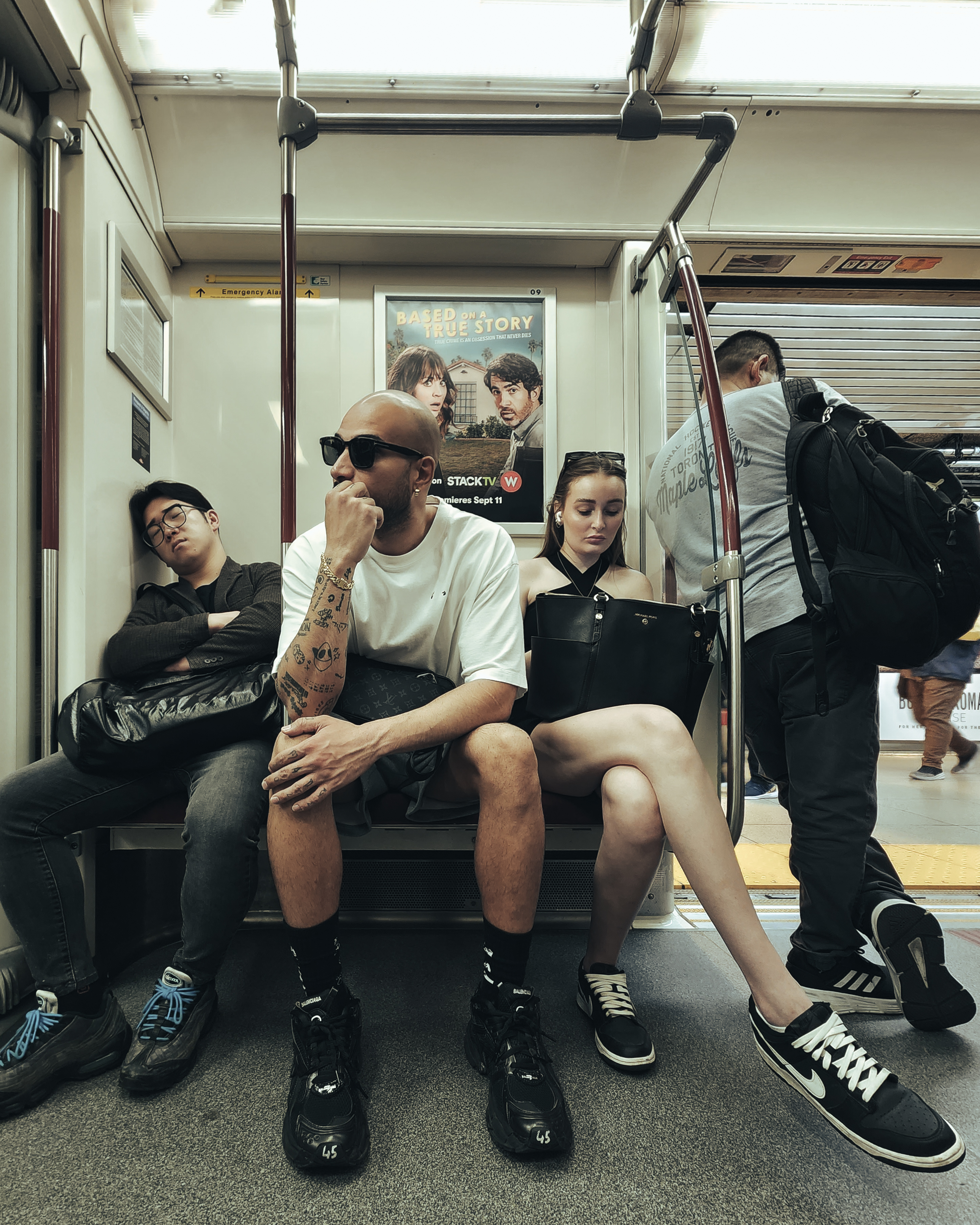
- Born: September 19, 1986 (age 39); Iran
- Occupation: photographer
- Years active: 2013–present

Sam Yari (Persian: سام یاری; born September 19, 1986) is an Iranian fashion photographer and director. He is the founder of Sam Yari Studio, which continues to develop, photograph, and exhibit work advocating the liberation of artists in strict regimes.

== Early life ==
Yari was born in Iran and was brought up in the UAE. He went to Malaysia to study and graduated from SEGi University with a degree in Interior Design. Later, he took professional photography courses at the Masoud Kimiai Azad Film Workshop Institute, and online courses of Albert Watson.

== Career ==
Yari, who has been interested in photography since childhood and practiced in Iran for five years, started pursuing it professionally in fashion and fine art photography in 2013. He migrated to Turkey at the beginning of 2015 during the arrest of models and photographers in Iran. From 2016 to 2021, he worked as a professional in photography, advertising and fine arts. In 2020, he founded Yari Studio in Istanbul, Turkey, and is currently engaged in photography and development in Ukraine.

In recent years, Yari has traveled to several countries for photography with different brands and has collaborated with modeling agencies, including the Barbarossa Moratti brand, which is published by Sky Life magazine (Turkish Airlines) in all the airlines of the world. He worked with Metropolitan Modeling Agency in France and Paris and with supermodels like Farnoosh Hamidian and Taina Soares. Yari also collaborated in the production of the short film Return with the support of the Ministry of Culture and Tourism and the Turkish Gendarmerie Command.

Yari photographed many famous people in Iran, such as Mohammad Reza Golzar, Bahareh Rahnama, Yas and Tarlan Parvaneh. Later, he photographed Hossein Tohi, Behzad Lito, Khalse and Seren Sarangil in Turkey.

In October 2021, Yari held a photography exhibition called Pravada in Kyiv, Ukraine, which focused on the restrictions, imprisonment and killing of photographers and artists in radical Islamic countries. The 15 photos taken by Yari showed pain and strong personality of all the victims of the fashion industry as a model. This exhibition was held with the presence of prominent artists and enthusiasts and was featured in various media such as Elle magazine, Segodnya and Global Happenings.
