= Sam Webster =

Sam Webster may refer to:

- Sam Webster (writer), writer and Thelemite
- Sam Webster (cyclist) (born 1991), New Zealand cyclist

== See also ==
- Samuel Webster (disambiguation)
