= Sam Uche Anyamele =

Nigerian actor

- Born: Sam Uche Anyamele; Lagos, Nigeria
- Education: University of Lagos
- Occupation: Nollywood Actor
- Years active: 2004–present
- Spouse: Osarhieme Edokpolor
- Awards: Africa Movie Academy Award

Sam Uche Anyamele, is an actor in Nigerian cinema.

== Personal life ==
Anyamele was born in Isolo, Lagos as the eldest of the family with six siblings: three boys and three girls. He completed education from Faronbi Primary School Isolo (1988 to 1993) and Ukwa East Local Government Area in Abia State and later to Isolo Grammar School (1993 to 1999). He completed a primary degree in Business Education in 2007 and Advertising and secondary degree in Promotion Management in 2009 at the University of Lagos.

He is married to his longtime partner, Osarhieme Edokpolor, with their wedding having been celebrated at Off Ugbor Village Road in GRA.

== Career ==
He used to play musical instruments at the Assembly of God Church. In 2004, he made maiden television appearance with Wale Adenuga’s story, No pain No Gain. In 2006, he won the Africa Movie Academy Award (AMAA) for Most Promising Actor for the role in Day of Atonement. He also worked as the Secretary-General of the National Association of Nigerian Theatre Arts Practitioners.

In 2019, Anyamele was appointed as the brand ambassador of Max Garden Estate. Later in the same year, he was announced as a host of Mykmary Fashion Show which was held on 31 August 2019.

In 2021, Anyamele made a minor comeback in the remake of the movie Aki and Pawpaw of the same title. He acted alongside Uti Nwachukwu, Chinedu Ikedieze and Osita Iheme.

In the same year, Anyamele alongside actors Omowumi Dada, Adeniyi Johnson, played the role of Governor Yanju Badru in the award winning short film Rebirth, a Homevida production, directed by Psalm Oderinde and Gbenga Adeoti, and written by a duo of Thecla Uzozie and Dawn-Ntekim Rex.

== Filmography ==
Year	Film	Role	Genre	Ref.
2004	No pain No Gain	Actor: Richard	TV film	
2005	Unforeseen 2	Actor	Video film	
2005	Unforeseen	Actor	Video film	
2005	Songs of Sorrow 2	Actor: Dave	Video film	
2005	Songs of Sorrow	Actor: Dave	Feature film	
2005	Day of Atonement	Actor	Video film	
2006	Without Apology 2	Actor	Video film	
2006	Without Apology	Actor	Video film	
2006	Occultic Wedding 3	Actor	Video film	
2006	Occultic Wedding 2	Actor	Video film	
2006	Occultic Wedding 3	Actor	Video film	
2006	Bafana Bafana 2	Actor: Hammed	Video film	
2006	Bafana Bafana	Actor: Hammed	Video film	
2014	Umbara Point	Actor: Kato	TV film	
2018	Children's Day	Actor	Video film	
2022	Rebirth	Actor: Governor Yanju Badru	short film	
