= Sam Collins (footballer, born 1989) =

English footballer

Personal information
- Full name: Samuel Christopher Collins
- Date of birth: 1 June 1989 (age 37)
- Place of birth: Southend-on-Sea, England
- Position: Midfielder

Youth career
- Milton Keynes Dons

Senior career*
Years	Team	Apps	(Gls)
2006–2008	Milton Keynes Dons	0	(0)
2007	→ Kettering Town (loan)		
2007–2008	→ Hendon (loan)	14	(1)
2008–2009	Hendon	21	(3)
2009	Wivenhoe Town		
2009–2011	Maidenhead United	65	(10)
2011	AFC Hornchurch		
2011	Concord Rangers		
2011–2013	East Thurrock United		
2013–2017	Concord Rangers		
2019-	Cheshunt		
- * Club domestic league appearances and goals

Samuel Christopher Collins (born 1 June 1989) is an English former professional footballer who played as a winger for Milton Keynes Dons, Kettering Town, Hendon, Wivenhoe Town, Maidenhead United, AFC Hornchurch, Concord Rangers, East Thurrock United, and Cheshunt.

== Playing career ==
Collins began his career at Milton Keynes Dons, and made his first-team debut on 1 November 2006, coming on as an 18th-minute substitute for Sean O'Hanlon in a 4–1 defeat at Brighton & Hove Albion in the League Trophy. On 22 November 2007, he joined Isthmian League Premier Division side Hendon on loan, having already completed a loan spell at Kettering Town. He was released in May 2008.

He scored a total of 18 goals in 161 appearances for Concord. He scored in the 2014 Essex Senior Cup final, as Concord beat Braintree Town 2–1, and was voted the club's Player of the Season for 2013–14. Speaking in June 2014, after securing Collins to a new contract, Rangers manager Danny Cowley said he was "irreplaceable".

== Management career ==
Collins was appointed first team manager of Concord Rangers FC on the 19th May 2023, and will lead them for his first season in the Isthmian Premier Division 2023/2024. Unfortunately he won only 5 of his league games and ensured Concord achieved the rare feat of two relegations in two seasons.

== Statistics ==
Club	Season	Division	League		Other		Total	
Club	Season	Division	Apps	Goals	Apps	Goals	Apps	Goals
Milton Keynes Dons	2006–07	EFL League Two	0	0	1	0	1	0
Milton Keynes Dons	2007–08	EFL League Two	0	0	0	0	0	0
Milton Keynes Dons	Total		0	0	1	0	1	0
Hendon (loan)	2007–08	Isthmian League Premier Division	14	1	4	0	18	1
Hendon	2008–09	Isthmian League Premier Division	21	3	6	1	27	4
Hendon	Total		35	4	10	1	45	5
Maidenhead United	2009–10	Conference South	41	9	7	2	48	11
Maidenhead United	2010–11	Conference South	24	1	5	2	29	3
Maidenhead United	Total		65	10	12	4	77	14
Concord Rangers	2013–14	Conference South	39	6	11	2	50	8
Concord Rangers	2014–15	Conference South	40	5	14	1	54	6
Concord Rangers	2015–16	Conference South	11	0	2	0	13	0
