= Sam Mbulaiteye =

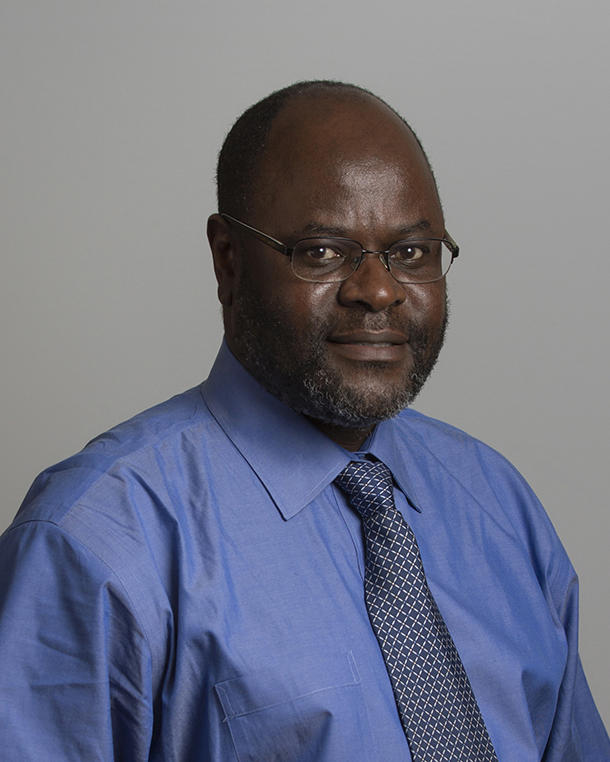
- Education: Makerere University; University of Cambridge
- Scientific career
- Fields: Cancer epidemiology
- Workplaces: National Cancer Institute

Sam Mbulaiteye (born in 1961) also known as Sam M. Mbulaiteye is a Ugandan physician-scientist and epidemiologist who researches Burkitt lymphoma. He is a senior investigator at the National Cancer Institute. He conducts population studies and uses molecular and proteomic methods to search for risk factors that may be targeted to prevent or identify cancer at early stages.

== Early life and education ==
Sam Mbulaiteye was born in 1961. He completed his advanced secondary education (UACE) at St. Mary's College Kisubi (SMACK) between 1982 and 1985.

Mbulaiteye went to Makerere University where he was trained as a physician in 1990 then joined University of Cambridge, U.K for an advanced training in epidemiology and biostatistics (M.Phil.)in 1994. After there, he was enrolled back at Makerere University for a specialist training in internal medicine (M.Med.).

== Career ==
=== Current roles and leadership (2025) ===
- Senior Investigator. Lead researcher in the Infections and Immunoepidemiology Branch (IIB) of the NCI's Division of Cancer Epidemiology and Genetics (DCEG).
- Principal Investigator. Heads the EMBLEM Study, a large case-control study investigating the multifactorial causes of Burkitt lymphoma (BL) across Uganda, Tanzania, and Kenya.
- Editor-in-Chief. Serves as Co-Editor-in-Chief of the journal Infectious Agents and Cancer.
- Committee Work. Active member of the DCEG Genotyping Review Committee.

=== Key scientific contributions ===
- Burkitt Lymphoma Research: His current work uses genomic methods, including Genome-Wide Association Studies (GWAS), to investigate how repeated malaria infections and the Epstein-Barr virus (EBV) interact to cause BL.
- HIV/AIDS and Cancer: He was the first to use record-linkage methods to study the association between HIV and cancer in low- and middle-income countries, starting in Uganda in 2005.
- Global Oncology: He provided early evidence showing declining HIV incidence in Uganda and identified the risk of Kaposi sarcoma-associated herpesvirus (KSHV) transmission via blood transfusions in Africa.

=== Career timeline ===
- Began his career at the Uganda Cancer Institute and the Uganda Virus Research Institute studying HIV and cancer in 1990s. He joined the NCI as a research fellow in 2000. He was awarded scientific tenure by the National Institutes of Health (NIH) and appointed Senior Investigator 2013. Later invited by the WHO's International Agency for Research on Cancer (IARC) to assist in revising the Burkitt Lymphoma chapter in the WHO Classification of Tumours.

He also holds membership in the Darwin College Society at the University of Cambridge.

== Honours ==
- DCEG Outstanding Mentor Award (2025). Recognized by the Division of Cancer Epidemiology and Genetics (DCEG) for his exceptional dedication to training and supporting junior scientists.
- Scientist of the Year (2022). Awarded by the Lymphoma Foundation of America for his leadership of the EMBLEM Study and his impactful work on the causes of childhood cancer in Africa.
- IARC/WHO Expert Contributor (2021). Invited by the International Agency for Research on Cancer to help update the WHO Classification of Tumours chapter on Burkitt lymphoma.
- NIH Scientific Tenure (2013). Formally awarded tenure by the National Institutes of Health (NIH) upon his appointment as a Senior Investigator.
- NCI Director’s Innovation Award. Received this internal award to support his research on the relationship between malaria and cancer risk.

== See also ==
- Ugandan Americans
- Makerere University School of Medicine
- Uganda Cancer Institute
- National Cancer Institute
