= Sam Fletcher (baseball) =

American baseball player

- Pitcher
- Born: February 21, 1881; Bedford, Pennsylvania, U.S.
- Died: Unknown
- Batted: Unknown Threw: Right

MLB debut
- October 6, 1909, for the Brooklyn Superbas

Last MLB appearance
- June 10, 1912, for the Cincinnati Reds

MLB statistics
- Win–loss record: 0–1
- Earned run average: 10.13
- Strikeouts: 8
- Stats at Baseball Reference

Teams
- Brooklyn Superbas (1909); Cincinnati Reds (1912)

Samuel Scott Fletcher (February 21, 1881 – unknown) was an American pitcher in Major League Baseball. He played for the Brooklyn Superbas in 1909 and the Cincinnati Reds in 1912.
