= Sam Day Jr. =

British jockey (1818–1838)

Personal information
- Born: 1818
- Died: 14 March 1838 (aged 19–20)
- Occupation: Jockey

Horse racing career
- Sport: Horse racing

Major racing wins
- Major races St Leger (1837)

Significant horses
- Mango

Sam Goddard Day (1818–1838), usually referred to as Sam Day Jr., was a British jockey who became the youngest winner of the St Leger when he won on Mango in 1837.

== Life and career ==
Day was the second son of John Barham Day, of the famous Day family of horsemen. Although he was round-shouldered, he achieved his success by being exceptionally strong and calm.

His victory in the St Leger was a lucky one. The favourite, Epirus, ridden by Bill Scott, stumbled into a ditch on the inside of the gravel road which crossed the Doncaster track around 200 yards from the start, and outsider The Prime Warden hit Scott as he stood up. Shortly after, a greyhound ran onto the track, bringing down another two horses – Dardanelles and Henriade. Having survived these two fracas, and with only four left in the race, Day won on Mango, although not without beating the horse severely. Elder brother John, riding Henriade, maintained he would have won if not for the greyhound.

On 9 March 1838, Day fell while out hunting with hounds. He was carried to a house at nearby Longstock, but died without regaining consciousness on 14 March.

== Major wins ==
(United Kingdom) Great Britain

- St Leger – Mango (1837)
