= Sam Day (rugby league) =

English rugby league footballer

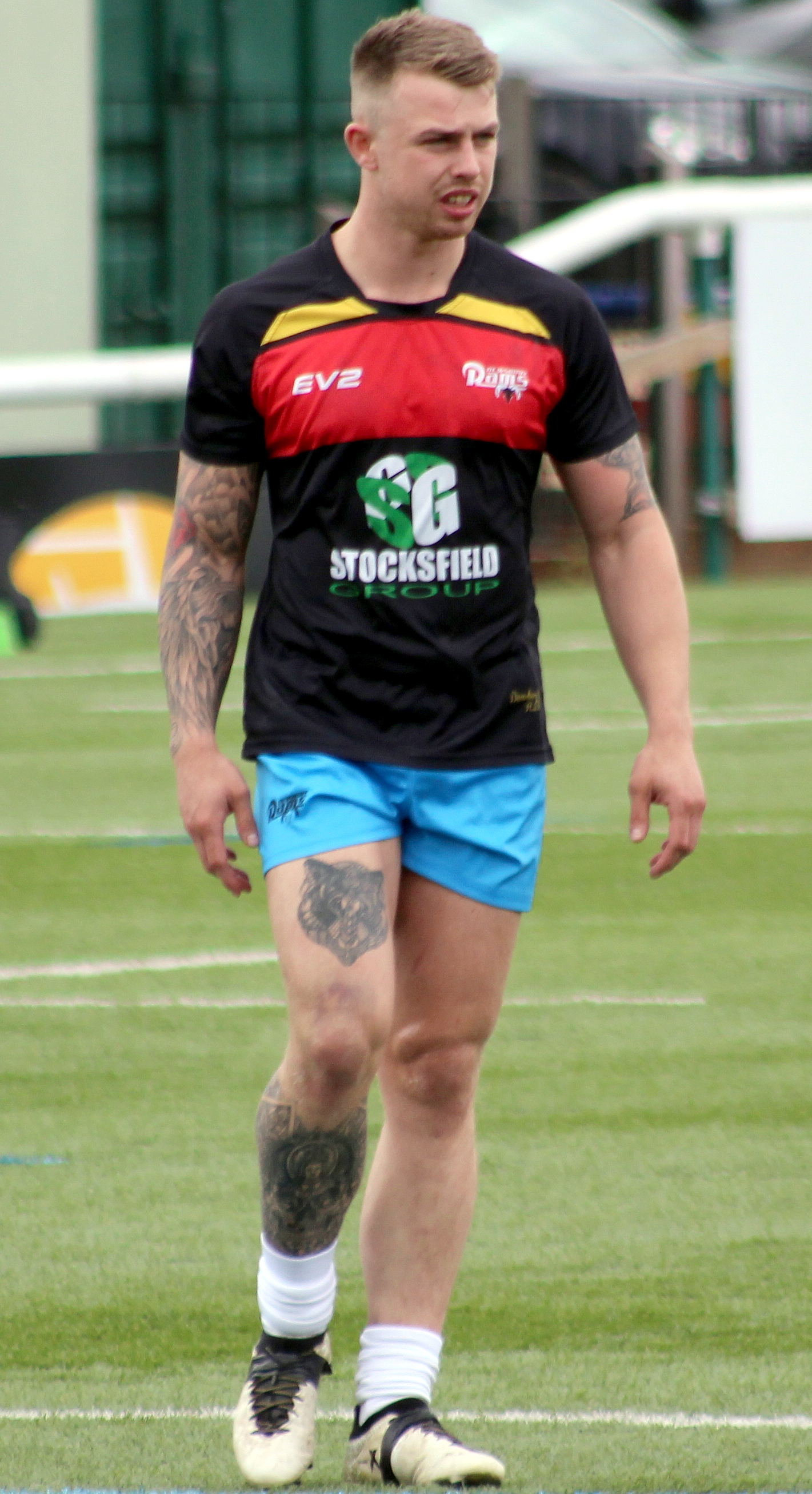

Personal information
- Full name: Samuel Day
- Born: 12 June 1994 (age 31) Wakefield, West Yorkshire, England
- Height: 5 ft 8 in (1.73 m)
- Weight: 11 st 12 lb (75 kg)

Playing information
- Position: Hooker
Club
Years	Team	Pld	T	G	FG	P
2015–17	Featherstone Rovers	15	2	0	0	8
2017(loan)	→ Dewsbury Rams	14	8	0	0	32
2018–2021	Dewsbury Rams	61	17	0	0	68
2023	Dewsbury Rams	12	5	0	0	20
2025	Dewsbury Rams
	Total	102	32	0	0	128
- Source: As of 23 November 2024

Sam Day (born 12 June 1994) is a former English professional rugby league footballer who played as a hooker.

== Background ==
Day was born in Wakefield, West Yorkshire, England.

== Career ==
He previously played for Featherstone Rovers, but after a loan period with Dewsbury in 2017 he joined them on a permanent deal for the 2018 season. Day left Dewsbury following the 2021 season but then re-joined the club for the 2023 season. Day spent the 2024 season at Yorkshire Men's League side Westgate Common, before re-signing for Dewsbury ahead of the 2025 season.
