= Sam Weller (cricketer) =

English cricketer (born 1994)

Personal information
- Full name: Sam David Weller
- Born: 21 November 1994 (age 31); Chislehurst, Kent
- Height: 6 ft 2 in (1.88 m)
- Batting: Right-handed
- Bowling: Right-arm fast
- Role: Bowler

Domestic team information
- Years: Team
- 2014–2016: Oxford MCC University
- 2015–2016: Kent (squad no. 19)
- First-class debut: 1 April 2014 Oxford MCCU v Nottinghamshire
- Last First-class: 5 April 2016 Oxford MCCU v Northants

Career statistics
Competition	First-class
Matches	6
Runs scored	74
Batting average	9.25
100s/50s	0/0
Top score	18*
Balls bowled	744
Wickets	15
Bowling average	26.20
5 wickets in innings	0
10 wickets in match	0
Best bowling	3/26
Catches/stumpings	1/–
- Source: CricInfo, 26 September 2016

Sam David Weller (born 21 November 1994) is an English former cricketer who played first-class cricket for Oxford MCC University. Weller captained the Oxford MCCU team in 2015 and 2016. He is primarily a right-arm fast bowler who also bats right-handed. He has played for Kent County Cricket Club Second XI and was awarded a professional contract with the County in 2014 although he did not make a senior appearance for the First XI.

== Early life ==
Weller was born in Chislehurst, Kent and he lived in Singapore for three years between the ages of 10 and 13, where he attended Tanglin Trust School. After his family returned to England, he attended Millfield School in Somerset, where he played for the school cricket team, as well as the Somerset under-14 and under-15 teams. After leaving Millfield, Weller studied at Oxford Brookes University.

== Cricketing career ==
At Oxford, Weller joined the Oxford MCC University squad. He played for the team and Combined MCC Universities in 2014 and went on to captain the Oxford team in 2015 and 2016. Since 2011, he has played club cricket for Hartley Country Club in the Kent Cricket League. Having initially been a member of the Somerset County Cricket Club Academy system, he joined the Kent County Cricket Club Cricket Academy. After impressing in both the academy and Second XI he was offered a professional contract in October 2014. In June 2015 he made an appearance as a substitute fielder for Kent against the touring Australians, taking two catches. Weller left Kent in September 2016 without playing a senior match for the county.
