= Sam Wright (English footballer) =

English footballer

Personal information
- Date of birth: 28 September 1997 (age 29)
- Position: Midfielder

Team information
- Current team: Belper Town

Youth career
- Bradford City

Senior career*
Years	Team	Apps	(Gls)
2016–2017	Bradford City	0	(0)
2017–2018	Ossett Town	21	(0)
2018–2019	Sheffield		
2019	Belper Town	8	(0)
2019	Bradford (Park Avenue)	3	(0)
2019–	Belper Town		
- * Club domestic league appearances and goals as of 21:28, 27 November 2019 (UTC)

Sam Wright (born 28 September 1997) is an English professional footballer who plays for Belper Town, as a midfielder.

== Career ==
He made his senior debut for Bradford City on 9 November 2016, in an EFL Trophy game against Morecambe.
