= Sam Wright (priest) =

Irish priest and dean

William Samuel Wright
- Dean of Connor
- Church: Church of Ireland
- Diocese: Diocese of Connor
- Predecessor: John Frederick Augustus Bond

Personal details
- Born: 1959 (age 66–67)

William Samuel Wright has been Dean of Connor since 2016.

Born in 1959 he was educated at Trinity College, Dublin and ordained in 1988. After a curacy in Belfast he held incumbencies at Cleenish and Lisburn before his appointment as Dean.

Church of Ireland titles
Preceded by John Frederick Augustus Bond	Dean of Connor; 2016–	Succeeded by Incumbent
