= Sam Webb (architect) =

British architect (1937–2022)

Sam Webb MBE
- Born: Samuel Webb; 5 August 1937; Finchley, London, England
- Died: 24 September 2022 (aged 85); Cambridge, England
- Education: Northern Polytechnic Institute
- Occupation: Architect
- Spouse(s): Sylvia Bartlett (m. 1961, divorced) Sheila Chrichton (m. 1974–2008)
- Children: 3

Samuel Webb MBE (5 August 1937 – 24 September 2022) was a British architect who was famous for his work on the structural and fire safety of Tower Blocks following his investigation into the Ronan Point tower block.

== Early life and career ==
Samuel Webb was born in Finchley, London, England on 5 August 1937. He graduated from the Northern Polytechnic in 1962. He worked as an architect at Camden Council and was subsequently a lecturer at Kent Institute of Art & Design from 1975 to 1996 and then established his own practice.

Webb was a nationally elected member of both the Royal Institute of British Architects Council and the Architectural Association Council. Webb sat on the All Party Parliamentary Fire & Rescue Group.

He was appointed Member of the Order of the British Empire (MBE) in the 2021 New Year Honours for services to architecture.

== Projects ==
Webb undertook significant research into the construction of the Ronan Point tower block and other "Large Panel System" buildings following the collapse of the flats after a gas explosion in 1968. After long negotiations with Newham Council, he was allowed to forensically dismantle Ronan Point to discover the extent of problems that had occurred in the building's initial construction. This eventually resulted in the demolition of Ronan Point and eight other panel system blocks on the Freemason's Road Estate in Newham, London in 1986.

He advised the legal team for the families in the Lakanal House fire of July 2009, when a fire raged through Lakanal House, a 14-storey block built in 1958 in Camberwell, south-east London. Six people were killed, among them two children and a baby, when a fire caused by a faulty television in a ninth-floor home gutted the building.

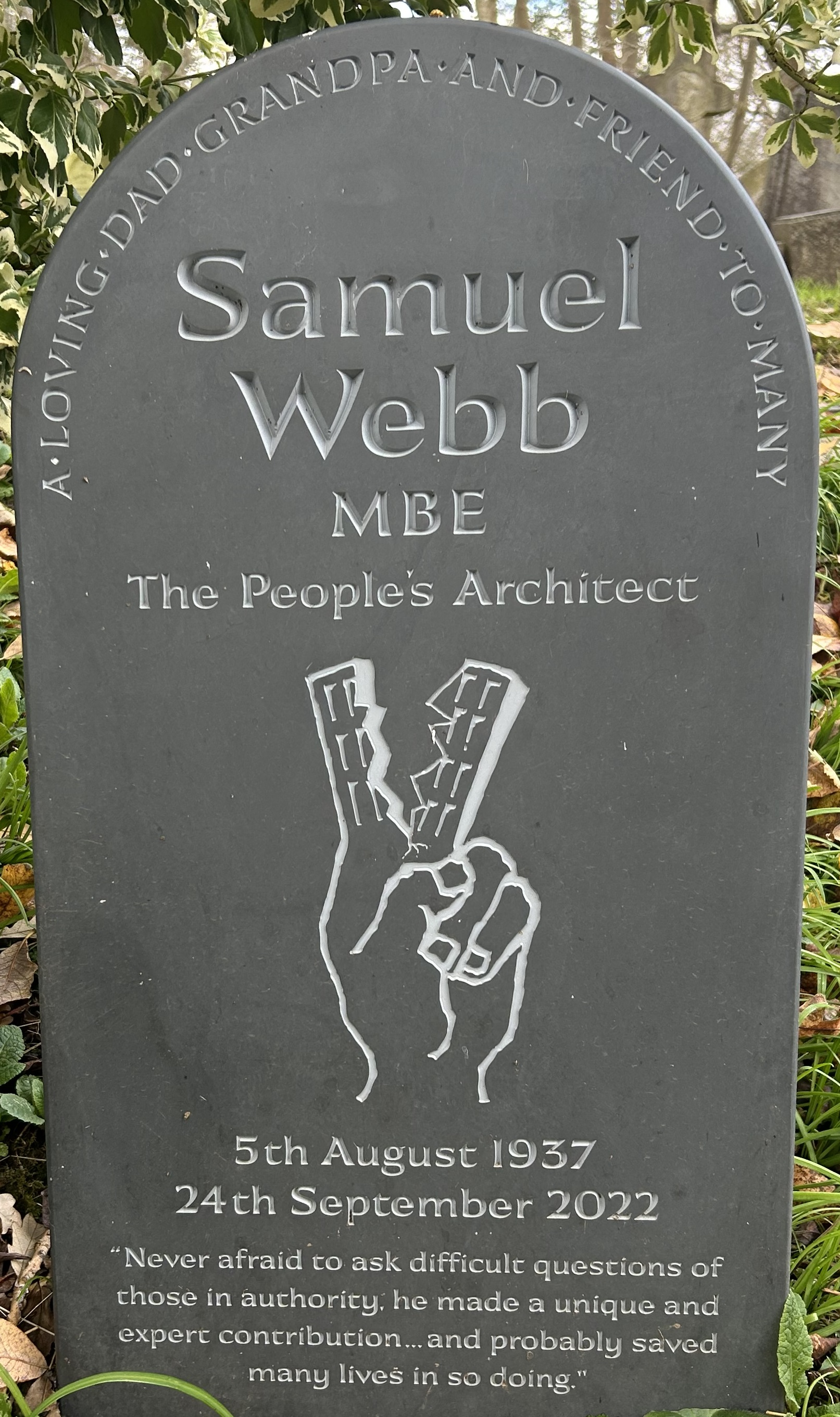
Grave of Samuel Webb in Highgate Cemetery

In 2009 and 2010 Webb expressed concern about timber framed large-scale construction methods, following recent fires. He had subsequently criticised the lack of action at national level following the Grenfell Tower fire.

In 2018, Webb, alongside Frances Clarke and Elizabeth Lowe launched Tower Blocks UK, an online hub and resource for residents and other individuals who are concerned about tower block safety.

== Death ==
Webb died at Addenbrooke's Hospital, Cambridge on 24 September 2022, aged 85. His ashes are buried on the eastern side of Highgate Cemetery. He was survived by his daughters and six grandchildren.
