= Sam Whiteman (New Zealand cricketer) =

New Zealand cricketer

Personal information
- Full name: Samuel James George Whiteman
- Born: 5 August 1982 (age 44); Auckland, New Zealand
- Batting: Right-handed
- Role: All-rounder

Domestic team information
- Years: Team
- 2002/03–2003/04: Auckland

Career statistics
Competition	First-class	List A
Matches	2	2
Runs scored	23	0
Batting average	7.66	0.00
100s/50s	0/0	0/0
Top score	11	0
Balls bowled	30	18
Wickets	0	0
Bowling average	20.00	–
5 wickets in innings	0	–
10 wickets in match	0	–
Best bowling	1/8	–
Catches/stumpings	0/-	0/-
- Source: CricketArchive, 15 November 2012

Samuel James George Whiteman (born 5 August 1982) is a New Zealand former cricketer who played for Auckland.

Born in Auckland, Whiteman was educated at Saint Kentigern College, and played under-17 representative cricket for Auckland, later touring Australia with a national underage team. In February 2001, he also played several matches for the New Zealand under-19 cricket team, against the touring South African under-19 team. Whiteman debuted for Auckland in the 2002–03 State Shield, against Central Districts at the Eden Park Outer Oval. Playing as an all-rounder, Whiteman played one further List A match in the 2002–03 season, and the following season, in the first-class State Championship, he played two more games. Whiteman subsequently retired from cricket, and moved to Sydney, Australia, to work in the finance industry, having attended Massey University and the Hong Kong University of Science and Technology. As of November 2012, he was a senior director at The Corporate Executive Board Company, having previously worked in positions with Virgin Money, ANZ, and the National Australia Bank.
