= Sam Thomas (campaigner) =

Sam Thomas (born 8 January 1986 in Brighton, East Sussex, UK) is a campaigner for men living with eating disorders, mental health concerns, and alcohol addiction. In 2008 he founded Men Get Eating Disorders Too (MGEDT) which in December 2010 became a registered charity in the UK.

In 2010 Sam won the TalkTalk "Digital Heroes" awards for the UK South-east region, and the Beat "Young Champion" award. "Beat" is the working name of the Eating Disorders Association. Sam was also shortlisted in the Young Philanthropist/Activist category for the Beacon Prize 2010.

Sam developed bulimia himself when he was a teenager. This was a response to mainly homophobic bullying he suffered at school. He has used his experience to develop an information resource to enable men living with eating disorders to offer one another peer-to-peer support and to improve levels of awareness and understanding throughout society.

As reported in the Brighton Argus, he launched the MGEDT website with support from ITV Fixers, a project run in the various regions of the UK national commercial television channel, ITV, which enables young people in the UK to make a difference by tackling a social problem.

The MGEDT campaign has featured in several national newspapers, in which Thomas has commented. A report in The Independent stated that one in ten men may suffer from anorexia or bulimia, to which Thomas said was "the tip of the iceberg".

During 2012 the charity is compiling a petition of at least 100,000 signatures to try and persuade the UK Government to improve services provided for eating disorder sufferers. Sam featured on BBC 1's "Inside Out" programme in Jan 2012 to further raise awareness of eating disorders in men, in particular the barriers sufferers faced seeking help.

In April 2012 Men Get Eating Disorders Too won its first major award in the Mental Healthy Awards for "Heroic Community Organisation".

Other media coverage featured Sam on ITV 1's Daybreak in November 2012 and Channel 4's "Supersize vs Superskinny" in January 2013.

Sam left his charity in April 2018 to focus on his recovery from alcoholism and complex-PTSD. He has written about his experiences of recovery and related issues for numerous online publications including HuffPost, The Independent, Insider, Metro, The Mirror and Newsweek.

His first memoir “Smashed Not Wasted” was due for publication by Guts Publishing in May/June 2023.
