= Sam Webb (model) =

British model (born 1986)

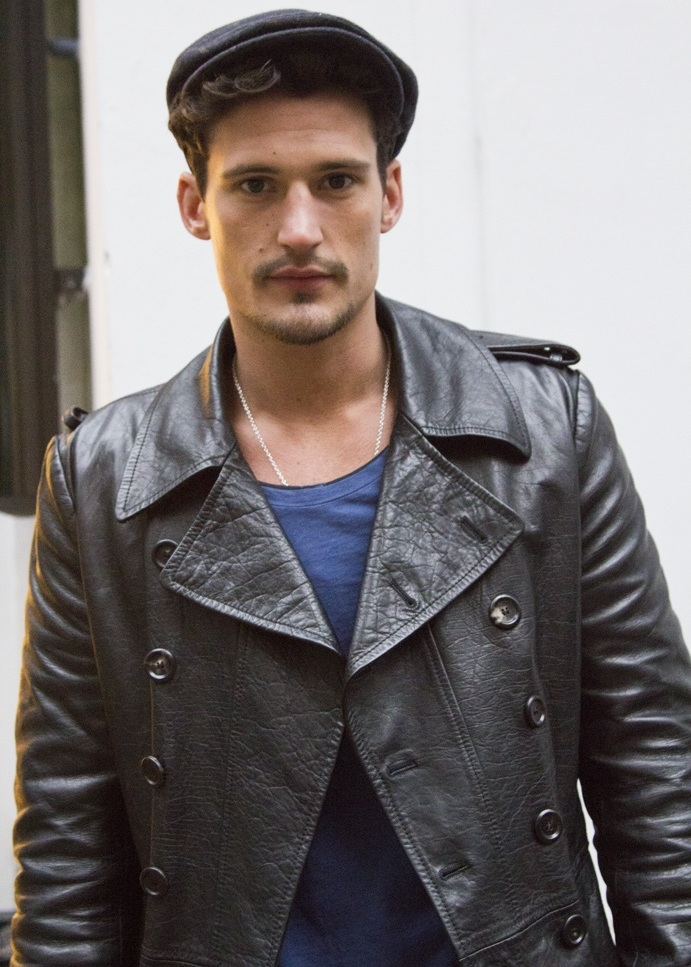
- Born: 23 May 1986 (age 39); Birmingham, United Kingdom
- Modeling information
- Height: 1.83 m (6 ft 0 in)
- Hair color: Brown
- Eye color: Brown
- Website: Sam Webb on Instagram

Sam Webb (born 23 May 1986) is a British model.

== Career ==
Sam Webb was born in Birmingham. He began his modelling career after being scouted in 2006 by the modelling agency Select Model Management. His early work included campaigns for Frankie Morello, Iceberg, Calvin Klein, Belstaff and Armani.

His first big break came walking in several Milan fashion shows. He was selected for the promotional campaign for Dolce & Gabbana photographed by Steven Klein alongside fellow models Adam Senn, David Gandy, and Noah Mills. Sam’s further work included shooting for Vogue Italia, Vogue Hommes, GQ, GQ Style and on numerous occasions working alongside photographers such as Bruce Weber, Giampaolo Sgura and Morelli brothers.

He has starred in various TV commercials such as: Diesel Only the Brave Tattoo Fragrance, Schweppes and Garnier to name a few.

Sam Webb became one of the faces of Dolce & Gabbana, appearing in the promotional campaigns of the brand. He then began working for other brands such as Roberto Cavalli, Giorgio Armani, Diesel, Ermanno Scervino, and 7 For All Mankind in an advertising campaign alongside Angela Lindvall.

In 2021, he starred in Dolce & Gabbana alongside Sharon Stone and Adam Senn.

== Agencies ==
- New Madison - Paris
- Priscilla's Model Management - Sydney
- Select Model Management - London
- Soul Artist Management - New York City
- Elite Toronto - Toronto
- View Management - Barcelona
- Why Not Model Management - Milan
