= Sam Wilder (American football) =

American football player (born 1982)

Profile
- Position: Offensive tackle

Personal information
- Born: January 10, 1982 (age 44); Dallas, Texas
- Listed height: 6 ft 5 in (1.96 m)
- Listed weight: 300 lb (136 kg)

Career information
- College: Colorado

Sam Wilder (born January 10, 1982) is an American former football offensive lineman. He played college football at the University of Colorado Boulder.

Wilder signed as an undrafted free agent with the Dallas Cowboys in April 2005. On August 17 of the same year, he was traded to the Tampa Bay Buccaneers for an undisclosed draft choice, however on August 30 the Buccaneers released him. On September 5, 2005, the San Francisco 49ers signed Wilder to their practice squad, where he spent the rest of the season. On January 5, 2006, he signed a two-year futures contract with the 49ers and was allocated to NFL Europe, where he was selected by Rhein Fire. On September 2, 2006, the 49ers waived Wilder and on September 12 they resigned him to their practice squad. On October 31 he was released by the 49ers. The Carolina Panthers signed Wilder to their practice squad on November 24, 2006, and on February 14, 2007, he signed a futures contract with the Indianapolis Colts. On September 1, 2007, the Colts waived him and the next day he was signed to the team's practice squad.
