= Samy =

Samy is a masculine given name and surname. Notable people with the name include:

== Given name ==
- Samy (director), Indian film director
- Samy Awad (born 1960), Egyptian modern pentathlete
- Samy Azer (born 1953), Australian physician & professor
- Samy Badibanga (born 1962), Congolese politician
- Samy Baghdadi (born 1997), French footballer
- Samy Benchamma (born 2000), French footballer
- Samy Bengio (born 1965), Canadian computer scientist
- Samy Benmayor (born 1956), Chilean painter
- Samy Bourard (born 1996), Belgian footballer
- Samy Boutouil (born 2000), Moroccan swimmer
- Samy Burch, American screenwriter
- Samy Chouchane (born 2003), Tunisian footballer
- Samy Colman (born 1996), Moroccan equestrian
- Samy D. (born 1968), Israeli ceramic artist
- Samy Deluxe (born 1977), German rapper
- Samy El-Shall, Egyptian-American physical chemist
- Samy Elmaghribi (1922-2008), Jewish-Moroccan musician
- Samy Faraj (born 2001), French footballer
- Samy Fawzy (born 1963), Egyptian Anglican bishop
- Samy Frioui (born 1991), Algerian footballer
- Samy Gemayel (born 1980), President of the Lebanese Kataeb Party
- Samy Houri (born 1985), French footballer
- Samy Kamkar (born 1985), American businessman
- Samy Kehli (born 1991), French professional footballer
- Samy Khalid, Canadian historian and herald
- Samy Kibula (born 1999), Congolese professional rugby league footballer
- Samy Mahmoud (born 1947), Canadian academic
- Samy Masselot (born 1989), France international rugby league footballer
- Samy-Oyame Mawene (born 1984), French footballer
- Samy Merheg (born 2006), Footballer
- Samy Mmaee (born 1996), Moroccan footballer
- Samy Molcho (born 1936), Israeli mime artist
- Samy Moussa (born 1984), Canadian conductor and composer
- Samy Moustafa (born 1998), Egyptian freestyle wrestler
- Samy Naceri (born 1961), French actor
- Samy Natera Jr. (born 1999), Mexican baseball player
- Samy Rashad (born 1990), Egyptian-born South Korean television personality
- Samy Abdel Razek (born 1980), Egyptian sport shooter
- Samy Rivers (born 1988), Mexican streamer
- Samy Rosenstock, birth name of Tristan Tzara (1896–1963), Romanian avant-garde poet, essayist, and performance artist
- Samy Sana (born 1988), Algerian Muay Thai kickboxer
- Samy Sandoval (born 1968), Panamanian musician
- Samy Seghir (born 1994), French actor
- Samy Shoker (born 1987), Egyptian chess grandmaster
- Samy Smaili (born 1965), French football manager
- Samy Szlingerbaum (1950–1986), Belgian screenwriter, actor, and film director
- Samy Vellu (1936–2022), Malaysian politician
- Samy Yousef, Egyptian fireworks and special effects director
- Samy Abu Zaid (1979–2009), Egyptian football player

== Surname ==
- Ahmed Samy (born 1992), Egyptian footballer
- Ama Samy (born 1936), Indian Zen master and Jesuit priest
- Chea Samy (1919–1994), Cambodian dancer
- Domingas Samy (born 1955), Bissau-Guinean poet and short story writer
- Hamad Samy (born 1899), Egyptian weightlifter
- K. P. P. Samy (1962–2020), Indian politician
- Melur R. Samy (died 2018), Indian politician
- Mohamed Samy (born 1997), Egyptian swimmer
- P. L. Samy (fl. 1960s), Indian civil servant
- P. T. Samy (1930–2004), Indian Tamil writer and screenwriter
- Tamim Samy (born 2000), Egyptian footballer
- V. P. M. Samy, Indian politician
- Yiagadeesen Samy, Mauritian academic
- Yousef Samy (born 1985), Afghan-American footballer

== Fictional characters ==
- Samy Garvin, a character on the Canadian animated television series Jimmy Two-Shoes

== See also ==
- Sami (name)
- Samie
- Sammi (disambiguation)
- Sammy
