= Samih =

Samih is an Arabic masculine given name and a surname. The feminine form of the given name is Samiha. Notable people with the name Samih include:

== First name ==
- Samih Darwazah (1930–2015), Jordanian politician and the founder of Hikma Pharmaceuticals
- Samih Farsoun (1937–2005), American scholar of Palestinian origin
- Samih Al Ghabbas (born 1974), Egyptian physician and writer
- Samih Abdel Fattah Iskandar, International Commissioner of the Jordanian Association for Boy Scouts and Girl Guides
- Samih Madhoun (died 2007), senior leader of the Al-Aqsa Martyrs Brigade, an armed group affiliated with the Palestinian political party Fatah
- Samih al-Qasim (1939–2014), Palestinian Druze poet with Israeli citizenship
- Samih Sawiris (born 1957), Egyptian-Montenegrin businessman and billionaire
- Samih Yalnızgil (1875–1932), Turkish linguist and politician

== Middle name ==
- Hassan Samih Chaitou (born 1991), Lebanese footballer

== Surname ==
- Basel Samih (born 1981), Qatari football player
- Naima Samih (1953–2025), Moroccan artist

== See also ==
- Saami (disambiguation)
- Sami (disambiguation)
- Sammi (disambiguation)
- Sami (disambiguation)
- Sämi
