= Carlos Maturana =

Chilean artist

Carlos Maturana (Bororo)
- Born: Carlos Eduardo Maturana Piña; November 10, 1953; Santiago, Chile
- Died: -
- Education: University of Chile
- Known for: Painting
- Movement: 80’s Generation
- Awards: 1975 First Prize, Faculty of Arts Alumni Salon, University of Chile, Santiago, Chile. 1977 Corporación de Amigos del Arte Scholarship, Santiago, Chile; 1978 Second Prize, Fundación Pacífico Scholarship Competition, National Museum of Fine Arts, Santiago, Chile; 1979 Research Project Grant, University of Chile, Santiago, Chile; 1980 Research Project Grant, University of Chile, Santiago, Chile; 1980 Corporación de Amigos del Arte Scholarship, Santiago, Chile; 1981 Corporación de Amigos del Arte Scholarship, Santiago, Chile; 1982 First Prize, The Tree in Chilean Art Contest, National Museum of Fine Arts, Santiago, Chile; 1982 Scholarship, Santiago Museum of Contemporary Art, Santiago, Chile; 1982 Corporación de Amigos del Arte Scholarship, Chile; 1983 Scholarship, Santiago Museum of Contemporary Art, Santiago, Chile; 1985 Honor Award, VII International Art Biennale of Valparaiso, Chile; 1986 Honorable Mention, Our Andean World Competition, Santiago Museum of Contemporary Art, Santiago, Chile; 1986 Honorable Mention, National Conference of Young Art, Sala El Farol, Valparaíso, Chile; 1987 Honorable Mention, V PREALC Carmen Waugh Gallery Contest, Santiago, Chile; 1987 Scholarship, Santiago Museum of Contemporary Art, Santiago, Chile; 1988 First Prize for “Central Santiago”, Urban Landscape Competition, Catholic University Gallery, Los Arcos de Bellavista, Santiago, Chile; 1997 First Place, Art in the World of Coffee Competition, New Visual Arts Gallery, Santiago, Chile; 2002 Bororo: Citizenship on Canvas, Artespacio, Santiago, Chile; 2003 First Place, Consorcio Building Competition: One View, Eight Artists, Santiago, Chile; 2004 Altazor Award, Santiago, Chile; 2007 Altazor Award for From the Man on the Moon to Dolly the Sheep exhibition, Artespacio, Santiago, Chile; 2008 Selected to exhibit at the International Contemporary Art Fair, Buenos Aires, Argentina;

Carlos Eduardo Maturana Piña, better known by his artistic pseudonym Bororo, is Chilean artist born in Santiago, Chile, on November 10, 1953. Along with Samy Benmayor, Omar Gatica, Matías Pinto D'Aguiar and Ismael Frigerio among others, he formed part of Chilean art’s 80s Generation. Bororo was his childhood nickname.

== Biography ==
Bororo studied a Bachelor of Fine Arts at the University of Chile’s School of Fine Arts and in 1972, he studied under the well-known artists Rodolfo Opazo, Ximena Cristi and Eduardo Garreaud.

Teaching formed an important part of his career. From 1975 to 1981, he was a teaching assistant and teacher in drawing, painting and sketching at the University of Chile's School of Fine Arts. From 1982 to 1985, he taught a Color and Graphic Expression workshop to design students at Gaston College and from 1983 to 1985, he taught at the Drawing and Painting Workshop at the Medical College of Chile's Art and Culture Institute (Spanish: Instituto de Arte y Cultura del Colegio Médico de Chile). Between 1983 and 1984 he taught at La Brocha Art Workshop, in Plaza Mulato Gil de Castro in the central Santiago neighbourhood of Lastarria. He also taught at the Planet Earth Academy of Art (Spanish: Academia de Arte Planeta Tierra).

== Style and technique ==
Bororo belonged to the 80s Generation group, primarily made up of artists from the University of Chile faculty of art and linked to German Neo-expressionism. This generation has become famous for the innovative art they produced after the 1973 Chilean coup d'état and during the dictatorship period, shocking Chilean society with non-traditional painting.

Just like his contemporary Samy Benmayor, Bororo used traditional materials like oil on canvas and watercolors, as well as other less traditional materials like latex and India ink on paper.

His work is notable for its symbolism, its basic shapes and the use of colour splatters that represent everyday objects.

== Career ==
=== Work ===
Works in public collections

- MUSEO NACIONAL DE BELLAS ARTES, SANTIAGO, CHILE

Fábrica de Paté de Chungungo en Tunquén, 1993, acrylic on canvas, 168 x 200 cm El Poeta y la Muerte, 1995, lithography, 76 x 56 cm Paisajes con Arboles

- MUSEO DE ARTE CONTEMPORÁNEO, UNIVERSITY OF CHILE, SANTIAGO, CHILE

Retrato, 1978, oil and latex on canvas, 170 x 110 cm Sin título, 1979, mixed techniques on canvas, 220 x 66 cm

- MUSEO DE ARTE MODERNO DE CHILOÉ, CASTRO, CHILE
- MUSEO DE ARTES VISUALES, MAVI, SANTIAGO, CHILE

Monumento de Todo Esto, 1991, oil on canvas, 170 x 139 cm El Farol, 1992, oil on canvas, 195.5 x 150.5 cm Sin título, 1991, oil on canvas, 58 x 58 cm

- MUSEO MUNICIPAL DE BELLAS ARTES DE VALPARAÍSO, CHILE

El Califont, graffiti and acrylics

- ASOCIACIÓN CHILENA DE SEGURIDAD, ACHS, POLICLÍNICO DEL TRABADADOR, COIHAIQUE, XI REGIÓN, CHILE

Pingüinos, 1996, oil on canvas, 200 x 300 cm

- COLECCIÓN COMPAÑÍA CERVECERÍAS UNIDAS, CCU, SANTIAGO, CHILE

Como Pez en el Agua, oil on canvas, 83 x 97 cm

- COLECCIÓN DE ARTE NESTLÉ, CHILE

Los Bohemios, acrylics on canvas, 200 x 167 cm

- ESCUELA MARIANO LATORRE, CURANILAHUE, CHILE

Sin Título

- PINACOTECA UNIVERSIDAD DE TALCA, CHILE

Extraterrestre llegando a mi casa, 2005, acrylics on canvas, 187 x 168 cm

=== Exhibitions ===
Solo exhibitions

- 1976 Galería Matta, Santiago, Chile.
- 1981 Galería Sur, Santiago, Chile.
- 1984 Galería Arte Actual, Santiago, Chile.
- 1985 Galería Arte Actual, Santiago, Chile.
- 1987 Galería Arte Actual, Santiago, Chile.
- 1989 Muestra de Pintura, Galería el Caballo Verde, Concepción, Chile.
- 1990 Plaza Mulato Gil, Santiago, Chile.
- 1991 Galería Arte Actual, Santiago, Chile.
- 1991 Galería Praxis, Santiago, Chile.
- 1991 Carlos Maturana Bororo, 6 Years of the Galería de Arte El Caballo Verde, Concepción, Chile.
- 1992 Magnus Gallery, Gent, Belgium.
- 1992 Chicago Art Fair, Chicago, United States.
- 1993 Galería Tomás Andreu, Santiago, Chile.
- 1995 Bororo, The World, Paintings, Galería Arte Actual, Santiago, Chile.
- 1996 Drawings and Paintings, 1994–1996, Galería Artespacio, Santiago, Chile.
- 1997 Bororo: Recent Works, Galería Artespacio, Santiago, Chile.
- 2005 From the Man in the Moon to Dolly the Sheep, Galería Artespacio, Santiago, Chile.
- 2006 From the Man in the Moon to Dolly the Sheep, Sala de Arte Casa Collahuasi, Iquique, Chile.
- 2007 The Rights of the Child, Biblioteca de Santiago, Santiago, Chile.
- 2008 Bororo Paintings, Galería Florencia Lowenthal, Santiago, Chile.
- 2009 Papers, Galería Artespacio, Santiago, Chile.

Joint exhibitions

- 1972 Fernán Meza Student Exhibition, Casa Central of the University of Chile, Santiago, Chile.
- 1973 Alumni Salon, Santiago Museum of Contemporary Art, University of Chile, Santiago, Chile.
- 1975 Alumni Salon, Facultad de Arte de La University of Chile, Santiago, Chile.
- 1975 National Bond Placement Painting Competition, National Museum of Fine Arts, Santiago, Chile.
- 1975 Arte Joven, Santiago Museum of Contemporary Art, University of Chile, Santiago, Chile.
- 1975 Salón Sur, University of Concepción and National Museum of Fine Arts, Santiago, Chile.
- 1975 Borges in Visual Arts, Santiago Museum of Contemporary Art, University of Chile, Santiago, Chile.
- 1976 View of Contemporary Art in Chile, Santiago Museum of Contemporary Art, University of Chile, Santiago, Chile.
- 1976 Painting Exhibition, Galería Matta, National Arts Content, Santiago Museum of Contemporary Art, University of Chile, Santiago, Chile.
- 1978 International Exhibition of Visual Arts, San Francisco Museum, Santiago, Chile.
- 1978 Five Chilean Graphic Artists at the University of Jerusalem and Tel-Aviv, Israel.
- 1978 Chilean-German Cultura Institute, Santiago, Chile.
- 1978 National Bond Placement Painting Competition, National Museum of Fine Arts, Santiago, Chile.
- 1978 Painting Competition, Fundación Pacifico Scholarship, National Museum of Fine Arts, Santiago, Chile.
- 1978 3rd Painting Contest, Exterior Relations Ministry, Chilean Diplomatic Academy, Santiago, Chile.
- 1979 National Bond Placement Painting Competition, National Museum of Fine Arts, Santiago, Chile.
- 1979 Galería C.E.D.L.A., Santiago, Chile.
- 1980 2nd National Bond Placement Competition, National Museum of Fine Arts, Santiago, Chile.
- 1980 Eight Young Painters, Santiago Museum of Contemporary Art, University of Chile, Santiago, Chile.
- 1980 2nd Young Art Conference, Las Condes Cultural Institute, Santiago, Chile.
- 1980 Amigos del Arte Society Exhibition, Santiago, Chile.
- 1980 University of Chile Art Faculty Professors’ Show, Taipei, China.
- 1981 Amigos del Arte Society Scholars’ Show, Torre Santa María, Santiago, Chile.
- 1981 Painting Show, Galería Sur, Santiago, Chile.
- 1981 2nd University Art Biennale, National Museum of Fine Arts, Santiago, Chile.
- 1982 2nd Visual Arts Contest, Santiago Museum of Contemporary Art, University of Chile, Santiago, Chile.
- 1982 The Tree in Chilean Painting Contest, National Museum of Fine Arts, Santiago, Chile.
- 1982 Scholars’ Show, Galería Arte Actual, Santiago, Chile.
- 1983 Show in Galería de Arte Actual, Santiago, Chile.
- 1983 Galería La Brocha, Santiago, Chile.
- 1983 The Survival of our Planet, Natural History Museum, Santiago, Chile.
- 1983 VI International Art Biennale, Valparaíso, Chile.
- 1983 50 Years of Chilean Painting, Instituto Cultural de Las Condes, Santiago, Chile.
- 1984 Art and the Planet's Survival, Natural History Museum, Santiago, Chile.
- 1984 Becados Amigos del Arte 1978–1984, Galería La Fachada, Santiago, Chile.
- 1984 Ilustraciones a poemas de Nicanor Parra, Galería Época, Santiago, Chile.
- 1985 Gráfica Xerox, Instituto Cultural de Las Condes, Santiago, Chile.
- 1985 VII Bienal Internacional de Arte, Valparaíso, Chile.
- 1985 Concurso Valdivia y su Río, Valdivia, Chile.
- 1985 El Tango, Galería Lawrence, Santiago, Chile.
- 1985 Chilean envoy from Galería Arte Actual to the London International Fair, England.
- 1985 Chilean Art Exhibition at Olympia, London, England.
- 1985 Bororo with José León, Galería Visuala, Santiago, Chile.
- 1985 Galería Arte Actual, Santiago, Chile.
- 1986 Exhibition of artists awarded scholarships by the Galería Arte Actual, Santiago, Chile
- 1986 Our Andean World Competition, Galería Arte Actual, Santiago, Chile.
- 1986 Youth Art National Conference, Sala El Farol, Valparaíso, Chile.
- 1986 Havana Biennale, Cuba.
- 1986 Joint exhibition, Madrid, Spain.
- 1986 Wurlitzer Art, Galería Bucci, Santiago, Chile.
- 1986 Bag of Cement Exhibition, Galería Bucci, Santiago, Chile.
- 1986 Paper Biennale, Buenos Aires, Argentina.
- 1986 Couples in Art, Galería Plástica Tres, Santiago, Chile.
- 1986 Eight Young Artists in Small Formats, Galería de Arte Praxis, Santiago, Chile.
- 1987 Chile Vive, Chilean Art Show, Círculo de Bellas Artes, Madrid and Barcelona, Spain.
- 1987 Joint Exhibition, Colectiva Galería Arte Actual, Santiago, Chile.
- 1987 Joint exhibition Galería Praxis, Santiago, Chile.
- 1987 Bienal de Cuenca, Ecuador.
- 1987 Joint exhibition, Taller 619, Santiago, Chile.
- 1987 Joint exhibition, Galería Época, Santiago, Chile.
- 1987 Joint exhibition, Galería Caballo Verde, Concepción, Chile.
- 1987 Humorous Painting Contest, Centro Cultural Casa Verde (Arrayán), Santiago, Chile.
- 1987 V PREALC Contest, El Empleo o su Carencia, Galería Carmen Waugh - Casa Larga, Santiago, Chile.
- 1987 Chile: New Generations, Museo Sívori, Buenos Aires, Argentina.
- 1987 12 Artists of Today, Galería Municipal de Arte Valparaíso, Chile.
- 1987 Two Continents Paint America, Galería Carmen Waugh, Casa Larga, Santiago, Chile.
- 1987 Deux Continents Peint L'Amérique, Galerie Anysetiers du Roy, Paris, France.
- 1987 Let's Encourage Art Contest, Guillermo Winter prize, Centro Casaverde, Santiago, Chile.
- 1988 Galería Época, Santiago, Chile.
- 1988 The Urban Landscape: Center of Santiago, Galería de Arte de la Universidad Católica, Santiago, Chile.
- 1988 Long Live the Postcard, National Museum of Fine Arts, Santiago, Chile.
- 1988 Exhibition of Chilean painters in Los Angeles, California, United States.
- 1988 Latin American Art Show, Italian Art Museum, Lima, Peru.
- 1988 Santiago, Florence, Paris: Vision of Young Chilean Painting, Palazziana Tiro al Volo, Florence, Italy.
- 1988 The Urban Landscape Painting Contest, El Centro de Santiago, Galería Universidad Católica Los Arcos de Bellavista, Santiago, Chile.
- 1988 Amigos del Arte Scholars, 1978–1984. Galería La Fachada, Santiago, Chile.
- 1988 Third Anniversary, 1985–1988, Galería El Caballo Verde, Concepción, Chile.
- 1988 Painting Painting, Galería del Cerro, Santiago, Chile.
- 1988 Images of Travelling to Los Angeles, United States, Centro de Extensión U.C., Santiago, Chile.
- 1989 Two Painting, Galería Arte Actual, Santiago, Chile.
- 1989 Chile by Chile, Galería Carmen Waugh, Santiago, Chile.
- 1989 Museo de Arte Moderno, Castro, Chiloé, Chile.
- 1989 Those 80s Years, National Museum of Fine Arts, Santiago, Chile.
- 1989 The Rights of the Child, Carlos Maturana y Georgia Wilson, Explanada Cultural Metro Estación Baquedano, Santiago, Chile.
- 1989 Painters of Chile in thel Edificio de la Construcción, Santiago, Chile.
- 1989 IX International Art Biennale of Valparaíso, Municipalidad de Valparaíso, Chile.
- 1990 Joint exhibition, Galería de Arte Actual, Santiago, Chile.
- 1990 Banco Bid acquired a Bororo work to exhibit in Washington, United States.
- 1990 In the Footsteps of Van Gogh, Galería Arte Actual, Santiago, Chile.
- 1990 Conference in Horcón, Chile.
- 1990 The Young Choose Their Godfathers, Galería Plástica Nueva, Santiago, Chile.
- 1990 Chile by Chile, Centro de Extensión U.C., Santiago, Chile.
- 1990 Exposición subasta de Pintura Joven, Galería de Arte Viña del Mar, Chile.
- 1990 Today's Chilean painting, Centro Cultural Buenos Aires, Buenos Aires, Argentina.
- 1990 Open Museum, Winter Ten Painters Collection, 1st Touring Show of the Winter Collection, Santiago Metro stations and cultural centres in the regions, Chile.
- 1990 Chileans in the Footsteps of Van Gogh, Gallery BEK, La Haya, Holanda.
- 1990 From Hope of Creation, National Museum of Fine Arts, Santiago, Chile.
- 1991 Salón Wiso de Arte Latinoamericano, Caracas, Venezuela.
- 1991 20 de 135, Amigos del Arte, Santiago, Chile.
- 1991 Talleres Santa Victoria, Galería Arte Actual, Santiago, Chile.
- 1991 The Capacity of Wonder at Everyday Life, Centro de Extensión de la Universidad Católica de Chile, Santiago, Chile.
- 1991 Art as Object, Galería Praxis, Santiago, Chile.
- 1991 Chileense Week, Semana de Chile, World Trade Center Amsterdam, Holand.
- 1992 Chile, Five Painters, envoy to the Expo 92, Seville, Spain.
- 1992 Inter-American Development Bank, Culture Center, Washington, United States.
- 1992 Pabellón de Las Artes, Seville Expo, Spain.
- 1992 Modern Art Museum, Castro, Chile.
- 1992 Bed, Galería Plástica Nueva San Francisco, Santiago, Chile.
- 1992 Maniesh Museum, Moscow, Russia.
- 1993 Eight Chilean Painters, Touring exhibition at Museo de Arte Moderno de Ciudad de México, Museo de Monterrey and Museo de Guadalajara, among others.
- 1993 Brush of the 21st Century, National Museum of Fine Arts, Santiago, Chile.
- 1993 Ten Years Later, Galería Gabriela Mistral, Ministerio de Educación, Santiago, Chile.
- 1994 Pittura Cilena Oggi, Instituto Italo-Latinoamericano, Rome, Italy.
- 1994 Chilean Visual Arts Today, Chilean Modern Art Museum Collection, National Culture Rooms at the Chilean Embassy, Buenos Aires, Argentina.
- 1994 Cervantes Institute, München, Germany.
- 1995 Scholars Collective, Sala Amigos del Arte, Santiago, Chile.
- 1995 Exhibition of works donated by the society of friends of the National Museum of Fine Arts, Santiago, Chile.
- 1997 Art in the World of Coffee Contest, Galería Isabel Aninat, Santiago, Chile.
- 1997 Introduction to the Gesture, Galería de Arte Posada del Corregidor, Santiago, Chile.
- 1998 The Chosen Ones of Chilean Painting, Las Condes Cultural Institute, Santiago, Chile.
- 1999 22 Artists in Tarot, Galería de Arte Isabel Aninat, Santiago, Chile.
- 2000 Energy and Light: Chile 2000, Painting Contest. ENERSIS/Amigos del Arte, Santiago, Chile.
- 2000 Drawing in 2000, Arteabierto, Fundación Bank Boston, Santiago, Chile.
- 2002 2 Museums Collection, Galería Bellas Artes del Metro de Santiago, Chile.
- 2003 Con Poner, Centro Cultural Matucana 100, Santiago, Chile.
- 2004 CCU in Culture Touring exhibition, National Museum of Fine Arts, Santiago, Chile.
- 2004 Chilean Art Crossing Borders, Ministerio de Relaciones Exteriores, Santiago, Chile.
- 2004 Chilean Art Crossing Borders. Croatia, Bucharest, Prague, Warsaw, Istanbul and Budapest.
- 2005 Contemporary Chilean Painters of the 2nd Half of the 20th Century (Pintores Chilenos Contemporáneos de la 2ª Mitad del Siglo XX), América Museum, Madrid, Spain.
- 2006 Chilean Cuisine in Art (La Comida Chilena en el Arte), Galería Trece, Santiago, Chile.
- 2006 Obras Marcadas III, Galería Animal, Santiago, Chile.
- 2006 Workshop Items (Cosas de Taller), Sala de Arte Campus Santiago de la Universidad de Talca, Santiago, Chile.
- 2007 CCU Pictorial Collection (Colección Pictórica de la CCU), Castillo Wulff, Viña del Mar, Chile.
- 2007 Anverso, Galería Florencia Loewenthal, Santiago, Chile.
- 2007 Benmayor, Bororo, Pinto D'Aguiar, Icons of the Eighties (Figuras de los Ochenta), Corporación Cultural de las Condes, Santiago, Chile.
- 2007 Recent Hours (Horas Recientes), Galería Vasari, Buenos Aires, Argentina.
- 2008 Eight Heads for a Brainteaser (Ocho Cabezas para un Rompecabezas), Galería Trece, Santiago, Chile.
- 2008 Digital Gravura: Digital Film Collection of Contemporary Chilean Artists (Digital Gravura: Colección de Grabados Digitales de Artistas Chilenos Contemporáneos), Santiago Museum of Contemporary Art de Valdivia, Chile.
- 2008 XVII Edition of the BA Art Fair (XVII Versión de la Feria ArteBA), Buenos Aires, Argentina.
- 2008 Chilean Artists for Allende (Artistas Chilenos por Allende), Museo de la Solidaridad Salvador Allende, MSSA, Santiago, Chile.
- 2008 Altazor, Chilean and Spanish Painters Illustrating Huibobro (Pintores Chilenos y Españoles ilustrando a Huidobro), Museo de América, Madrid, Spain.
- 2009 Three on the Highway (Tres en la Carretera), Instituto Cervantes, Brasilia, Brazil.
- 2009 Painting on the Road (Pintura en el Camino), Instituto Cervantes, São Paulo, Brazil.
- 2010 Centenary Exhibition (Exposición Centenario) National Museum of Fine Arts, Santiago, Chile.
- 2010 100 Years of the Chilean National Team, (100 Años de la Selección Chilena), Galería Artium, Santiago, Chile.
- 2010/11 All Heart Donors (Donantes de Todo Corazón), Centro Cívico de Las Condes, Santiago, Chile.
- 2011/2 MAC 80s Collection (Colección 80's MAC), Santiago Museum of Contemporary Art, MAC, University of Chile, Santiago, Chile.

=== Awards ===
- 1975 First Prize, Faculty of Arts Alumni Salon, University of Chile, Santiago, Chile.
- 1977 Corporación de Amigos del Arte Scholarship, Santiago, Chile;
- 1978 Second Prize, Fundación Pacífico Scholarship Competition, National Museum of Fine Arts, Santiago, Chile;
- 1979 Research Project Grant, University of Chile, Santiago, Chile;
- 1980 Research Project Grant, University of Chile, Santiago, Chile;
- 1980 Corporación de Amigos del Arte Scholarship, Santiago, Chile;
- 1981 Corporación de Amigos del Arte Scholarship, Santiago, Chile;
- 1982 First Prize, The Tree in Chilean Art Contest, National Museum of Fine Arts, Santiago, Chile;
- 1982 Scholarship, Santiago Museum of Contemporary Art, Santiago, Chile;
- 1982 Corporación de Amigos del Arte Scholarship, Chile;
- 1983 Scholarship, Santiago Museum of Contemporary Art, Santiago, Chile;
- 1985 Honor Award, VII International Art Biennale of Valparaiso, Chile;
- 1986 Honorable Mention, Our Andean World Competition, Santiago Museum of Contemporary Art, Santiago, Chile;
- 1986 Honorable Mention, National Conference of Young Art, Sala El Farol, Valparaíso, Chile;
- 1987 Honorable Mention, V PREALC Carmen Waugh Gallery Contest, Santiago, Chile;
- 1987 Scholarship, Santiago Museum of Contemporary Art, Santiago, Chile;
- 1988 First Prize for “Central Santiago”, Urban Landscape Competition, Catholic University Gallery, Los Arcos de Bellavista, Santiago, Chile;
- 1997 First Place, Art in the World of Coffee Competition, New Visual Arts Gallery, Santiago, Chile;
- 2002 Bororo: Citizenship on Canvas, Artespacio, Santiago, Chile;
- 2003 First Place, Consorcio Building Competition: One View, Eight Artists, Santiago, Chile;
- 2004 Altazor Award, Santiago, Chile;
- 2007 Altazor Award for From the Man on the Moon to Dolly the Sheep exhibition, Artespacio, Santiago, Chile;
- 2008 Selected to exhibit at the ArteBA International Contemporary Art Fair, Buenos Aires, Argentina

== See also ==
- Agustín Abarca
- Alberto Valenzuela Llanos
- Pablo Burchard
- Alfredo Valenzuela Puelma
- Los diez (grupo literario), in Spanish
