= Sammi (given name) =

Sammi is a unisex given name. Notable people with the given name include:

- Sammi Awuku (born 1984), Ghanaian politician
- Sammi Adjei (born 1973), Ghanaian football player
- Sammi Baloch (born 2000) Baloch human rights activist
- Sammi Brown (born December 21, 1984) American politician
- Sammi Cannold is an American film and theater director
- Sammi Cheng (born 1972), Hong Kong singer
- Sammi Cheung (born 1987), Hong Kong actress
- Sammi Cohen (born 1988 or 1989), American director
- Sammi Davis (born 1964), British actress
- Sammi Fajarowicz (born 1908-1940), German chess master
- Sammi Giancola (born 1987), American television personality
- Sammi Hanratty (born 1995), American actress
- Sammi Kao (born 1969), Taiwanese singer
- Sammi Kane Kraft (born 1992-2012), American actress
- Sammi Kinghorn (born 1996), Scottish wheelchair racer
- Sammi Rotibi American-Nigerian film actor
- Sammi Sanchez (born 1998), Mexican-American singer
- Sammi Smith (born 1943-2005), American singer

== See also ==
- Sammy
- Sammie (name)
- Samy
- Sami (name)
- Sam (given name)
- Samuel (name)
- Samson (name)
- Sampson (given name)
- Samantha
- Saman (name)
- Sammi (disambiguation)
