= Sammy (disambiguation) =

Sammy is a nickname.

It may also refer to:

== People ==
- Daren Sammy (born 1983), Saint Lucian cricketer and head coach of the West Indies
- Jasmine Sammy, Trinidad and Tobago cricketer in the 1970s
- DJ Sammy, stage name of Spanish DJ and producer Samuel Bouriah (born 1969)

== Arts and entertainment ==
- Sammy (comics), a Belgian comics series which began in 1970
- Sammy (band), the 1994-1996 partnership of guitarist Luke Wood and guitarist/vocalist Jesse Hartman
- Sammy (TV series), a short-lived 2000 American animated television series

== Other uses ==
- Sammy Corporation, a Japanese manufacturer of games and a subsidiary of Sega Sammy
- Sigma Alpha Mu, a college fraternity also known as "Sammy"

== See also ==
- Sammi (disambiguation)
- Samy (disambiguation)
- Sami (disambiguation)
