= José Gil de Castro =

Peruvian artist (1785–1841)

- Born: 1 September 1785; Lima, Viceroyalty of Peru (present-day Peru)
- Died: Between 1839 and 1850
- Education: Trained by José del Pozo
- Known for: Painting
- Notable work: Portrait of Bernardo O'Higgins; Portrait of José de San Martín (1818); Portrait of Simón Bolívar (1823); Portrait of Bernardo de Torre Tagle (1823); Portrait of José Olaya (1828); Portrait of Luis José de Orbegoso (1835)
- Awards: Legion of Merit of Chile

José Gil de Castro y Morales (1 September 1785 – c. 1840–41) was an Afro-Peruvian portrait painter, cartographer and soldier who spent many years in Chile.

== Biography ==
José Gil de Castro was born in the city of Lima, the capital of the Viceroyalty of Peru; his parents were free citizens. His first studies were with Julián Jayo (?–1821) in Trujillo while he was stationed in Lima as an officer in the colonial militia. When he returned to Lima he was apprenticed to José del Pozo.

Somewhere between 1805 and 1808, he moved to Chile, where he opened a studio and established his reputation as a portrait painter. He was familiarly known as "El Mulato Gil". In 1816, he was appointed Grand Master of the Guild of Painters. That same year, he enlisted in the Army of the Andes and was appointed an officer in the Corps of Engineers. He was placed in charge of making maps, a trade he had practiced earlier in Peru. In 1817, he was married in Santiago and became a Captain in the Rifle Battalion. He also built a house in the Barrio Lastarria and was named one of the first members of the Legion of Merit of Chile. His home and the surrounding grounds are now part of the Plaza Mulato Gil de Castro.

Thanks to his reputation as a portrait painter, he travelled extensively throughout Chile and Argentina, working on commissions from notable public figures. A distinguishing characteristic of his work is the text relating to his subject, placed on a banner, plaque or other device, that he included on many of his canvases. In 1820, he became a cartographer for the new Chilean government, but returned to Peru, probably in 1825, and was appointed an official government painter. One of his most notable portraits, and one of the few that does not depict a member of the upper classes, is the one of José Olaya, a fisherman who became a hero of the Peruvian War of Independence.

Although his birthdate can be ascertained from baptismal records, his date and place of death are unknown. Later sources, from the 1870s, say he died at the age of sixty-five, although his death has been placed from 1839 to 1850. The Chilean writer Antonio Gil Íñiguez, in his novel Cosa Mentale (A Mental Thing, 1992), attempts to recreate the painter's life, in a fantastical manner.

== Gallery ==
=== Portraits ===
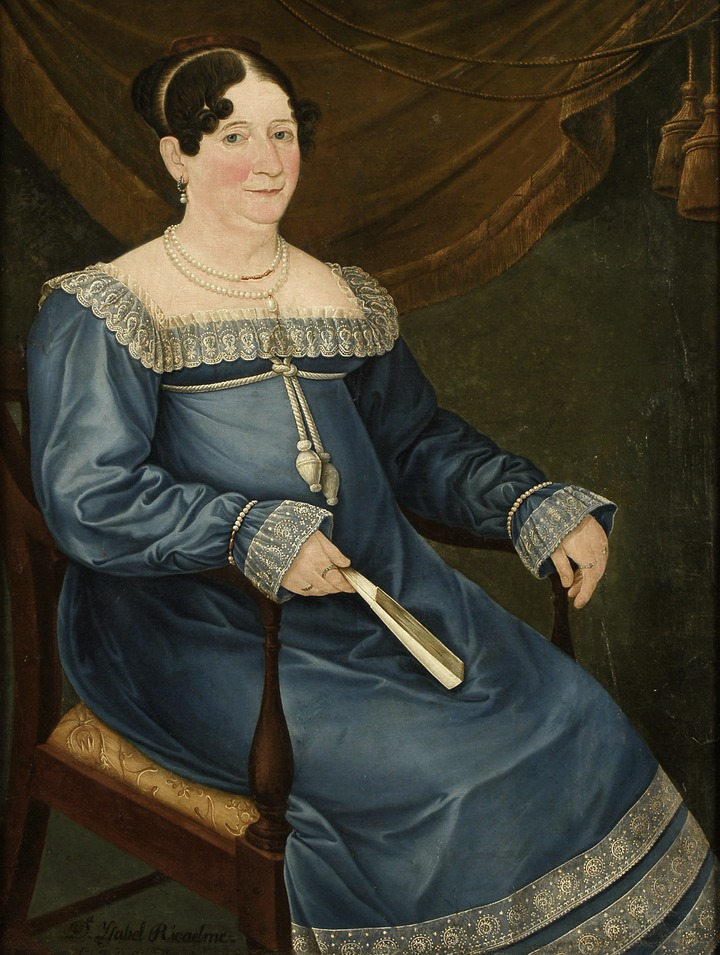
Portrait of Isabel Riquelme y Meza (1819), Museo Histórico Nacional, Santiago

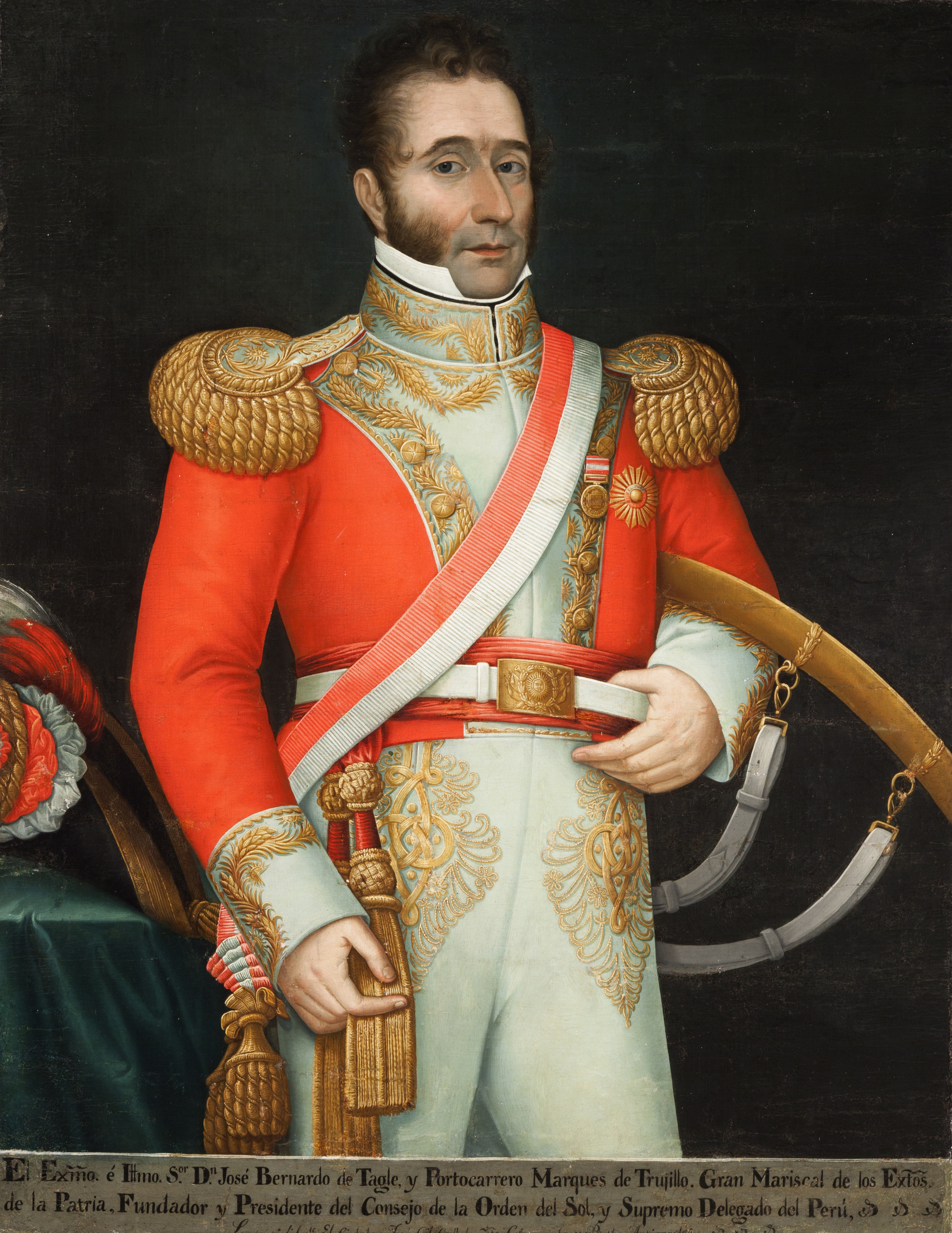
Portrait of Bernardo de Torre Tagle (1823), Museo Histórico Nacional, Buenos Aires

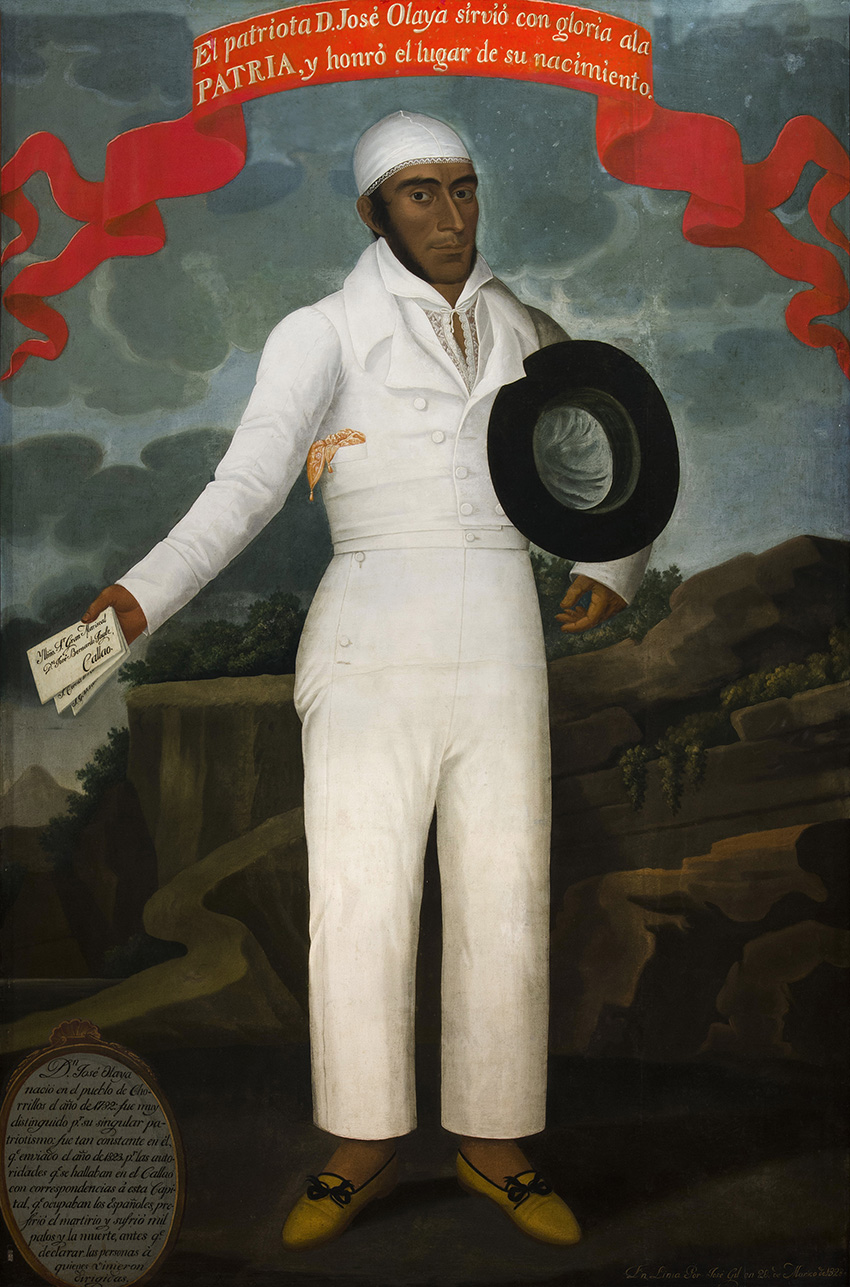
Portrait of José Olaya (1828), Museo Nacional de Arqueología, Antropología e Historia del Perú, Lima

=== Religious paintings ===
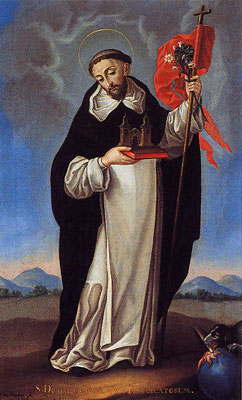
Saint Dominic (1817), Museo Nacional de Bellas Artes, Santiago

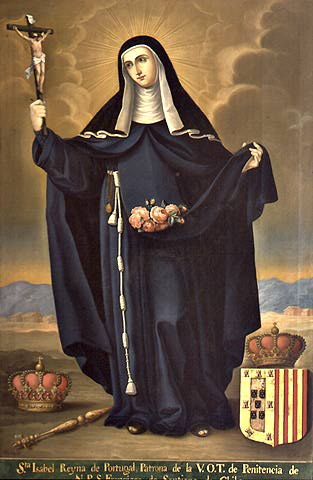
Queen Saint Elizabeth of Portugal (1820), Museo San Francisco, Santiago

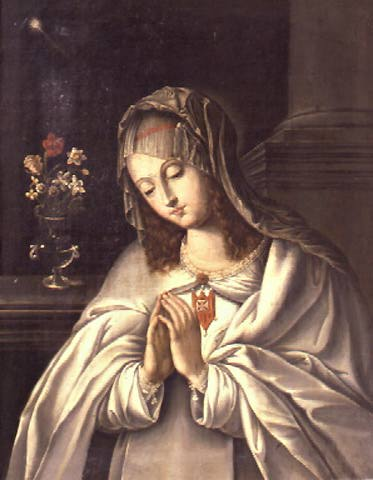
Virgin of Mercy (1820), Museo San Francisco, Santiago
