= Samiha =

Samiha (Arabic: سميحة or سامحة ; Bengali: সামিহা) is an Arabic feminine given name, the feminine form of Samih or Sameh. Notable people with the name include:

- Samiha Ayoub (1932–2025), Egyptian actress
- Samiha Ayverdi (1905–1993), Turkish writer
- Samiha Khalil (1923–1999), Palestinian political figure and charity worker
- Samiha Khrais (born 1956), Jordanian novelist, journalist and translator
- Samiha Mohsen (born 1998), Egyptian swimmer
- Samiha Naili, Egyptian former international table tennis player

== See also ==
- Samia (name), people with this name
