= Legion of Merit (disambiguation) =

Legion of Merit may also refer to:

- Legion of Merit is about the United States decoration.
- Legion of Merit of Chile, for the Chilean order.
- Legion of Merit (Rhodesia), for the Rhodesian order.
- Pour le Mérite, known informally as the Blue Max (German: Blauer Max), was the German Kingdom of Prussia's highest order of merit (German: Verdienstorden).
