= Sami =

== Acronyms ==
- SAMI, Synchronized Accessible Media Interchange, a closed-captioning format developed by Microsoft
- Saudi Arabian Military Industries, a government-owned defence company
- South African Malaria Initiative, a virtual expertise network of malaria researchers

== People ==
- Sami (name), including lists of people with the given name or surname
- Sámi people, the indigenous people of Norway, Sweden, the Kola Peninsula and Finland
- Samantha Shapiro (born 1993), American gymnast nicknamed "Sami"

== Places ==
- Sami (ancient city), an ancient Greek city in the Peloponnese
- Sami, Burkina Faso, a district
- Sämi, a village in Lääne-Viru County in northeastern Estonia
- Sami District, Gambia
- Sami, Cephalonia, Greece, a municipality
  - Sami Bay, east of Sami, Cephalonia
- Sami, Gujarat, India, a town
- Sami, Paletwa, Myanmar, a town

== Other uses ==
- Sámi languages, languages spoken by the Sámi
- Sami (chimpanzee), kept at the Belgrade Zoo
- Sami, a common name for Prosopis cineraria, a tree

== See also ==
- Karuppuswamy, a regional Hindu deity
- Saamy, a 2003 Indian Tamil-language film
- Saami
- Samee, a masculine given name
- Sámi Radio
- Sammi (disambiguation)
- Sammy (disambiguation)
- Samy
- Sápmi, a cultural region in Northern Europe
