= Sameh =

Sameh (Arabic: سامح) is an Arabic surname and male given name. Notable people with this name include:

== Surname ==
- Abdelrahman Sameh (born 2000), Egyptian swimmer
- Ahmed Sameh, Egyptian computer scientist

== Given name ==
- Sameh Abdel Rahman (born 1943), Egyptian fencer
- Sameh Ashour, Egyptian lawyer
- Sameh Derbali (born 1986), Tunisian football player
- Sameh Fahmi (born 1949), Egyptian politician
- Sameh Maraaba (born 1992), Palestinian football player
- Sameh Mohamed (born 1980), Egyptian field hockey player
- Sameh Naguib, Egyptian sociologist
- Sameh El-Saharty, Egyptian doctor
- Sameh Saeed (born 1992), Iraqi football player
- Sameh Shoukry (born 1952), Egyptian diplomat
- Sameh Soliman (born 1941), Egyptian water polo player
- Sameh Abdel Waress (born 1971), Egyptian handball player
- Sameh Youssef (born 1978), Egyptian football player
- Sameh Zakout, Palestinian rapper
- Sameh Zoabi, Palestinian director
