= G. P. Mathur =

Administrator of Mahe
- In office 2 July 1957 – 7 November 1958
- Preceded by: Achuthan Nair
- Succeeded by: S. Barkatali

G. P. Mathur was an Indian civil servant and administrator. He was the administrator of Mahe from 2 July 1957 to 7 November 1958.
