= Plaza Mulato Gil de Castro =

Coordinates: 33°26′16″S 70°38′27″W

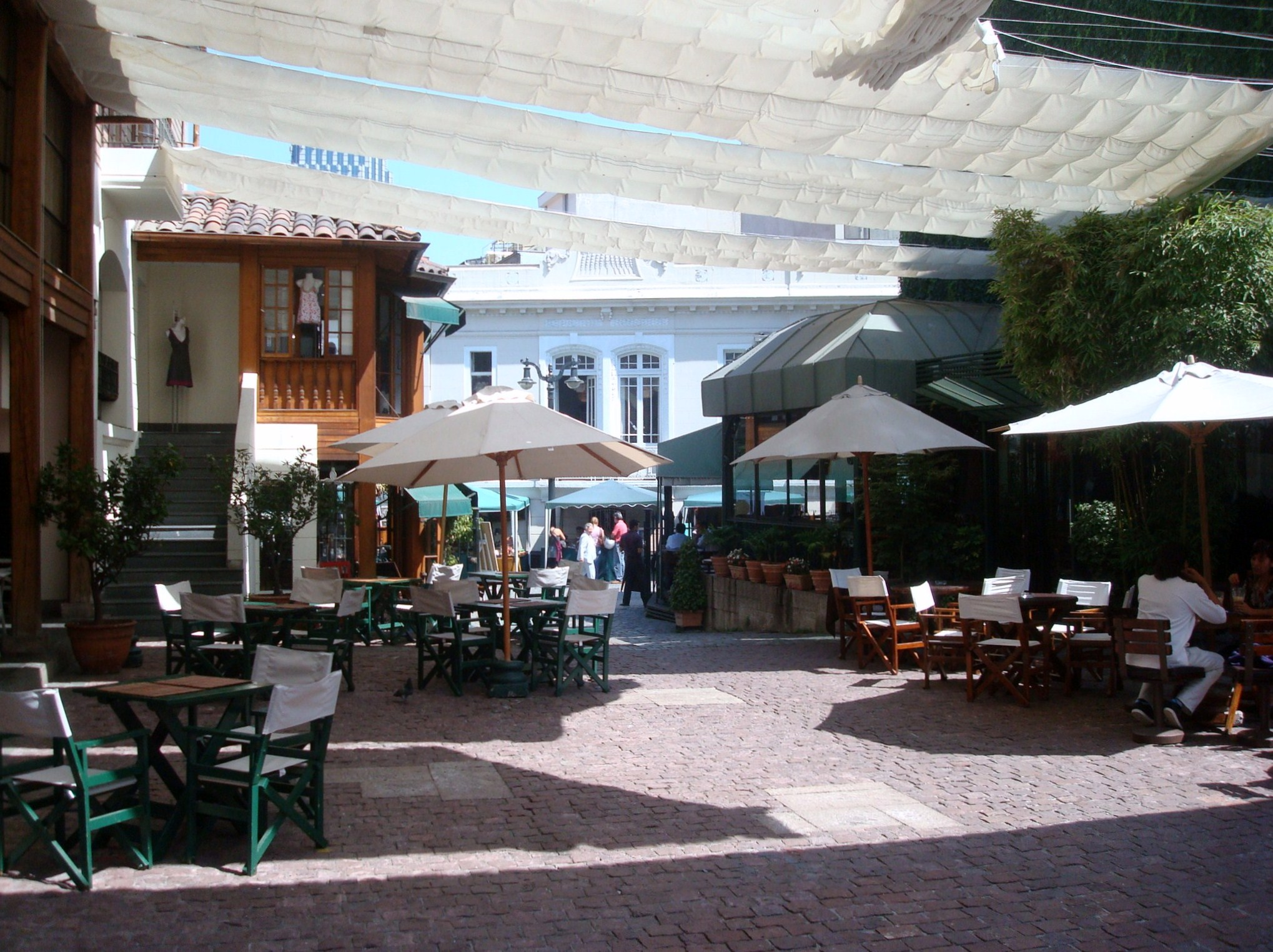
Plaza Mulato Gil de Castro.

Plaza Mulato Gil de Castro is located in Barrio Lastarria, between Plaza Baquedano, Parque Forestal and Cerro Santa Lucía in Santiago, Chile. A popular destination for tourists and locals alike, the area is known for its cultural offerings and hosts a number of cafés, bookstores, museums, galleries, cultural centers, theaters and bars in its surrounds. The plaza itself provides access to a cultural center featuring both a visual arts and archeological museum.

Metro stations Universidad Católica and Bellas Artes offer direct access to Barrio Lastarria.

== Origin and development ==
As with many neighborhoods in Santiago's center, Barrio Lastarria was built around a church: the Iglesia de la Veracruz. Houses were built between the winding streets, notably the house of Gil de Castro, built in the beginning of the 19th century, which stands next to the plaza. Despite the neighborhood's early origins, the plaza was only built in 1981 due to interest in preserving a series of facades beginning at the historic house of Gil de Castro.

During the 1990s, the neighborhood began a process of restoration with care not to alter its bohemian and intellectual flavor, with a number of cafés, bars and cultural centers appearing towards the end of the decade and the restoration of facades of the Church of Vera Cruz in 2001 and 2002.

Since then, as an historic area in Santiago, it has been able to maintain its traditional character despite new development.

== See also ==
- Barrio Lastarria
- Iglesia de la Veracruz
