= S. Barkatali =

Administrator of Mahe
- In office 8 November 1958 – 21 August 1960
- Preceded by: G. P. Mathur
- Succeeded by: C. Raman

S. Barkatali was an Indian civil servant and administrator. He was the administrator of Mahe from 8 November 1958 to 21 August 1960.
