= Narasing Rao Kallurkar =

Indian Civil Servant

Administrator of Mahe
- In office 9 November 1960 – 31 May 1967
- Preceded by: C. Raman
- Succeeded by: P. L. Samy

Narasing Rao Kallurkar was an Indian civil servant and administrator. He was the administrator of Mahe from 9 November 1960 to 31 May 1967.
