= C. Raman =

Indian civil servant and administrator of Mahe in 1960

Administrator of Mahe
- In office 22 August 1960 – 21 October 1960
- Preceded by: S. Barkatali
- Succeeded by: Narasing Rao Kallurkar

C. Raman was an Indian civil servant and administrator. He was the administrator of Mahe from 22 August 1960 to 21 October 1960.
