= Domingas Samy =

Bissau-Guinean poet and short story writer

- Born: January 2, 1955; Cacheu Region
- Occupation: Writer

Domingas Barbosa Mendes Samy (born January 2, 1955) is a Bissau-Guinean poet and short story writer. She has published in four languages, Guinean Creole, Portuguese, Russian, and French. Her short story collection A Escola: Contos ("The School: Stories," 1993) was the first work of prose fiction published by an author from Guinea-Bissau.

Domingas Samy was born on January 2, 1955 in Bula in the Cacheu Region of the colony of Portuguese Guinea. She attended the Honório Barreto National High School in Bissau, renamed the Kwame Nkrumah National High School in her final year when Guinea-Bissau gained independence. She attended Voronezh State University in the Soviet Union, earning a degree in Germanic philology in 1981. Her first published poems appeared in Russian newspapers and magazines, including Molodoi Kommunar and Soviet Life.

Samy returned to Guniea-Bissau to teach French at her alma mater. Her poems appeared in the Antologia Poética da Guiné-Bissau (1990), considered a groundbreaking work. Her short story collection A Escola contains three stories focusing on the plight of African women. In "A Escola," focuses on three teenagers: Maria Sábado, Nena, and Cristina. While Cristina takes school seriously, Maria Sábado and Nena do not. Maria Sábado has a baby she leaves in her mother's care while Nena has a backstreet abortion and dies of AIDS. In "Maimuna," the title character's abusive father forces her to marry an older man, but she escapes to Cuba with her boyfriend. "O Destino" focuses class conflicts and colonialism. Anazinha and Albertinho are two siblings whose father is murdered by the PIDE, the Portuguese secret police. They are abused by their bosses and the sister Anazinha has a illegitimate mestiço son by the son of her employer.

Samy became a leading member of the African Party for the Independence of Guinea and Cape Verde and served as director of the National Library of Guinea-Bissau and the secretary of the National Union of Artists and Writers of Guinea-Bissau.
