= Sámi Radio =

Sámi Radio may refer to a Sami language radio station:

- NRK Sápmi, previously NRK Sámi Radio, a public radio station in Norway
- Yle Sámi Radio (Northern Sami: Sámi Radio), a public radio station in Finland

== See also ==
- Sameradion, a public radio station in Sweden
