= Samie =

Samie is a surname and given name. Notable people with the name include:

Surname

- Catherine Samie (1933–2026), French actress

Given name

- Samie Elishi (born 2000), English television personality
- Samie Parker (born 1981), American football player and coach
