= P. L. Samy =

Indian civil servant (fl. 1960s)

Administrator of Mahe
- In office 6 June 1967 – 3 June 1969
- Preceded by: Narasing Rao Kallurkar
- Succeeded by: V. Krishnamurthy

P. L. Samy was an Indian civil servant and administrator. He was the administrator of Mahe from 6 June 1967 to 3 June 1969.
