= Chea Samy =

Cambodian dancer (1919–1994)

- Born: 1919; Kampong Cham Province
- Died: 1994 (aged 74–75)
- Occupation: Dancer, politician
- Spouse(s): Loth Suong

Chea Samy (1919 – 1994) was a Cambodian dancer. She is credited with the preservation and revival of robam kbach boran (classical Cambodian dance) following the Cambodian genocide by the Khmer Rouge. She was the sister-in-law of Pol Pot, leader of the Khmer Rouge.

Chea Samy was born in 1919 in Kampong Cham Province, Cambodia to a family of farmers. In 1925, at the age of 5 or 6, she joined the royal dance troupe at the palace of King Sisowath in Phnom Penh, which was under the charge of Princess Soumphady. After Sisowath's death in 1927, under his son King Monivong the troupe was led by Luk Khun Meak, a dancer and Monivong's mistress. Chea Samy became the leading dancer of Monivong's court, and her roles included Moni Mekhala in the Robam Moni Mekhala.

Chea Samy married Loth Suong, a palace clerk and cousin of Luk Khun Meak. She and her husband helped raise Loth Suong's younger brother, Saloth Sâr, the future Pol Pot. She recalled "He was a very good boy. In all the years he lived with me, he never gave me any trouble at all."

Chea Samy and her husband relocated to the countryside when the Khmer Rouge forcibly evacuated Cambodian cities, and they were forced to hide their identities as those with royal connections were persecuted. She did not learn of the identity of Pol Pot until 1979, when his photo was posted in the communal kitchen where she worked.

Following the fall of the Khmer Rouge, the new government immediately attempted to save Cambodian culture before it was lost. Almost all the other practitioners of Cambodian classical dance, including Luk Khum Meak, had died in the Cambodian genocide, and the government turned to Chea Samy as nearly the sole surviving expert in the art form. She trained new generations of dancers, preserving Cambodian dance. She also choreographed new pieces, such as Priep Santepheap (Doves of Peace).

Chea Samy's story is told in the documentary Pol Pot Dancing by Enrique Sánchez Lansch, which premiered in July 2024 at the Thessaloniki International Documentary Festival.
