= Sammy =

Sammy is a nickname, frequently for people named Samuel or Samantha, and also an English spelling of the Arabic name Sami.

== People ==
=== Music ===
- Sammy Adams (born 1987), American rapper and songwriter
- Sammy Cahn (1913–1993), American songwriter
- Sammy Davis Jr. (1925–1990), American singer and actor
- Sammy Fain (1902–1984), American composer
- Sammy Hagar (born 1947), American rock musician
- Sammy Johns (1946–2013), American country singer-songwriter
- Sammy Kershaw (born 1958), American country music artist
- Sammy Masters (1930–2013), American rockabilly musician
- Sammy Price (1908–1992), American jazz, boogie-woogie and jump blues pianist and bandleader

=== Sports ===
- Sammy Adjei (born 1980), Ghanaian footballer
- Sammy Baugh (1914–2008), American college and Hall-of-Fame National Football League player and coach
- Sammy Brooks (footballer) (1890–1960), English footballer
- Sammy Byrd (1906–1981), American baseball player and golfer
- Sammy Carlson (born 1989), American freestyle skier
- Sammy Collins (1923–1998), English footballer
- Samuel Day (sportsman) (1878–1950), English amateur cricketer and footballer
- Sammy Davis (American football) (born 1980), American National Football League player
- Sammy Korir (born 1971), Kenyan long-distance runner
- Sammy Lee (diver) (1920–2016), Korean-American diver and two-time Olympic Games champion
- Sammy Lee (footballer) (born 1959), former Liverpool footballer and former Bolton Wanderers manager
- Satoru Sayama (born 1957), Japanese wrestler with the stage name "Sammy Lee"
- Sammy Luftspring (1916–2000), Canadian boxer
- Sammy Mandell (1904–1967), American world lightweight champion boxer
- Sammy McIlroy (born 1954), Northern Ireland footballer
- Sammy Omosigho (born 2004), American football player
- Sammy Price (American football) (born 1943), American National Football League player
- Sammy Henia-Kamau (born 2006), Kenyan footballer
- Sammy Kibet Rotich (born 1980), Kenyan long-distance runner
- Sammy Solís (born 1988), American professional baseball player
- Sammy Sosa (born 1968), Dominican baseball player
- Sammy Stewart (1954–2018), American Major League Baseball pitcher
- Sammy Stewart (footballer, born 1920) (1920–1995), Scottish footballer
- Sammy Stewart (footballer, born 1991), Northern Irish footballer
- Sammy Traoré (born 1976), French and Malian footballer
- Sammy Watkins (born 1993), American National Football League player
- Sammy Weir (born 1941), American football coach and player
- Sammy White (American football) (born 1954), American National Football League player

=== Other ===
- Sammy Albon (born 1992), British YouTuber and radio personality
- Sammy Brooks (1891–1951), American film actor
- Sammy Davis Sr. (1900–1988), American dancer, father of Sammy Davis Jr.
- Sammy Douglas Waweru Kamau, Kenyan politician
- Sammy Tak Lee (born 1939), Hong Kong billionaire property developer
- Sammy Lee (choreographer), American choreographer of Ali Baba Goes to Town
- Sammy Lee (scientist) (1958–2012), British expert in in vitro fertilisation
- Sammy Stephens (born 1957), American entertainer
- Sammy Wilson (politician) (born 1953), British MP from Northern Ireland
- Sammy Younge Jr. (1944–1966), murdered African-American civil rights activist

== Fictional characters ==
- Sammy Brown, a character in the American biographical romantic musical drama teen movie Clouds
- Sammy (Ninjago), a character in Ninjago
- Sammy Jo Carrington, on the American TV show Dynasty
- Sammy Fabelman, the main protagonist of Steven Spielberg's semi-autobiographical film The Fabelmans
- Sammy Lawrence, a minor antagonist in the Bendy and the Ink Machine video game series
- Sammy the Owl, official mascot of the athletics teams of Rice University
- Sammy the Shunter, locomotive in the children's books by Eileen Gibb
- Sammy, a Belgian comics series and its main character, Sammy Day
- Sammy, A female squirrel from Great Wolf Lodge
- Sammy, a character from Work It Out Wombats!
- Sammy Watts, character in Angelina Ballerina

== See also ==
- Sam (disambiguation)
- Sammie (name)
