= Sameh El-Saharty =

International health policy specialist

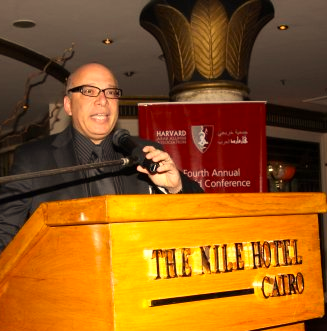
- El-Saharty at The Harvard Chan School of Public Health
- Born: January 30; Cairo, Egypt
- Scientific career
- Fields: International health, health policy, health insurance, health management, public health
- Workplaces: The World Bank

Sameh El-Saharty (Arabic: سامح السحرتى) is an Egyptian medical doctor and global health expert. He works as Senior Health Policy Advisor for different organizations including The World Bank in Washington, DC; Commissioner on the Lancet Global Health Commission on People-centered Care (PCC) for Universal Health Coverage (UHC); Affiliate Faculty at Harvard Medical School (HMS); Member of the High-Advisory Committee on Human Capital with the Deputy Prime Minister of Egypt. Dr. El-Saharty had joined the Bank in 1998 and was the first Egyptian to work in the health, population, and nutrition (HNP) sector at the World Bank since its establishment. During this period, he was responsible for leading the health policy dialog and health strategy development for client countries as well as managing several programs and projects amounting to more than $5 billion in more than 30 countries in three world regions. Before his current position, he was the Program Leader for Human Development, responsible for the Health, Nutrition and Population, education, social protection and labor markets in the Gulf Cooperation Council countries. He had also held the position of Adjunct A. Professor of International Health at Georgetown University in Washington, D.C.

== Education ==
He graduated from Cairo University School of Medicine in 1982 and received a Master of Public Health from the Military Medical Academy in Egypt in 1988, a Certificate in Business Administration from the American University in Cairo in 1988, a Fellowship in Social and Economic Policy from Harvard Kennedy School, and Master of Public Health in International Health Policy and Management from Harvard University in 1991.

== Major publications in international health ==
He authored and contributed to more than 80 published books, papers, articles, studies, reviews, and technical reports. His most cited works include: "Achieving the Demographic Dividend in Egypt: Choice not Destiny"; “Curbing the Noncommunicable Disease Epidemic in the Middle East and North Africa: Prevention Among Young People Is The Key”; “The Path to Universal Health Coverage in Bangladesh: Bridging the Gap of Human Resources for Health”; “Connecting Sectors and Systems for Health Results”; “Capitalizing on the Demographic Transition: Tackling Non-Communicable Diseases in South Asia"; and “Improving Health Service Delivery in Developing Countries: From Evidence to Action”. The links to these reports and his other most important publications are below.

== Professional experience ==
El-Saharty provided policy advice and managed programs and projects that spanned a wide range of health programs and systems including maternal and child health, nutrition, communicable and non-communicable diseases, health promotion and behavior change, health service delivery, hospital management, human resources, health governance, public expenditures, health financing, health insurance, and health reform. He is one of the leading experts who designed the Health Sector Reform Program in Egypt in 1998 that piloted the expansion of health insurance coverage and introduced the family health model in the country. Prior to joining the World Bank, he has worked for several organizations including the United States Agency for International Development (USAID), Pathfinder International, Clark Atlanta University, the American University in Cairo (AUC), Vinci (construction) (formerly Société Générale d’Entreprises), Ministry of Health and Population (Egypt), and Cairo University School of Medicine. He also worked for part-time or provided short-term consultancies to several organizations including Harvard School of Public Health (HSPH), Harvard Kennedy School of Government, University of North Carolina at Chapel Hill, United Nations Population Fund (UNFPA), Management Sciences for Health (MSH), and the World Health Organization (WHO).

== Professional affiliations ==
El-Saharty is a member of the Global Think Tank of the Center for Translation Research and Implementation Science of the National Heart, Lung, and Blood Institute of Health. He serves as a member of the Dean’s Leadership Council of Harvard T.H. Chan School of Public Health and is a member and now the President-Elect of the Executive Committee of the School’s Alumni Council. In addition, he serves as a member of the Executive Committee of the Arab Staff Association the World Bank-International Monetary Fund. In the past, he served on the advisory board of several institutions including the MENA Health Policy Forum, the Harvard Arab Alumni Association, and the Institute for Social and Economic Policy in the Middle East at Harvard University.

== Awards and recognitions ==
He received several awards including the Knowledge Management Award (2012) and Award of Excellence (2009) from the World Bank; the Alumni Leadership Award (2010) from Harvard University; and was decorated with the “Medal of Officer of the Independence” of the National Order (2006) by the President of the Republic of Djibouti; and the Middle East Fellowship (1990) from the Institute for Social and Economic Policy in the Middle East, Kennedy School of Government, Harvard University.

== Conferences and presentations ==
- Bangladesh: Racing with Population Growth. Lecture at Georgetown University. December 8, 2014.
- Implementation Research & Delivery Science: A Journey of Discovery. Presentation at the HIV Implementation Science Symposium. Johns Hopkins University. October 21, 2014.
- Advancing Implementation Research and Delivery Science: Action Agenda. Presentation at the Third Health Systems Research Symposium at Cape Town, South Africa. September 30, 2014.
- Applying Program Science to Strengthen People-Centered Health Systems: The Example of AIDS in India. Presentation at the Third Health Systems Research Symposium at Cape Town, South Africa. September 29, 2014.
- Population and Family Planning Policy Harmonization. Presentation at the High-Level Forum on Sexual and Reproductive Health, Negombo, Sri Lanka. May 25, 2014.
- Implementation & Delivery Science: Putting the Client in the Driver's Seat. Presentation at the Advisory Board Meeting and Consultations of the John Fogarty International Center for Advanced Study in Health Sciences, the National Institutes of Health. May 13, 2014.
- Health Policy and System Research: A perspective from the frontline. Presentation at the Consultation Meeting on Capacity Development for Health Policy and Systems Research in Low and Middle Income Countries, Johns Hopkins University. March 11, 2014.
- Delivery of Targeted Interventions to Curb the HIV/AIDS Epidemic in India: A Case Study from Andhra Pradesh and Karnataka. The World Bank. July 17, 2013.
- Tackling Non-communicable Diseases in South Asia: What can other sectors do? Presentation at the Human Development Week. The World Bank, Washington DC, USA. February 6, 2013.
- Bangladesh Human Resources for Health: Bridging the Gap. Presentation at the Health Systems Reform in Asia Conference, Hong Kong, December 11, 2011.
- USAID/Egypt Health and Population: Legacy Review and the Way Forward. Panel Video at Woodrow Wilson International Center for Scholars, Washington, DC, May 23, 2011.
- Capitalizing on the Demographic Transition: Tackling Noncommunicable Diseases in South Asia. Presentation at the Global Health Council Conference, Washington, DC, June 15, 2011.
- Improving Health Service Delivery in Developing Countries: From Evidence to Action: Research Methods. Presentation at the First global Symposium on Health Systems Research, Montreux, Switzerland, November 18, 2010.
- Human Resources for Health: Policies for Thought. Presentation at the South Asia Regional High Level Forum on Health Financing, Maldives, June 2–4, 2010.
- Healthcare systems in the Arab world: how to cope with evolving demand. Panelist at The Arab World in a New Global Context: Challenges, Choices and Opportunities, Washington, D.C. 7‐8 December 2009.
- Towards Reaching a Critical Mass. Opening Speech at the Fourth Arab World Conference on Shaping the Future, Harvard Arab Alumni Association, Cairo, Egypt, March 28, 2009.
- Can the MENA Region Face the Health Systems Challenges of the new Millennium? Presentation at the Fourth Arab Weekend at Harvard University, December 2008.

== List of publications and project documents ==
List of El-Saharty publications may be found at: Research Gate.

Books

- Curbing the Noncommunicable Disease Epidemic in the Middle East and North Africa: Prevention Among Young People IS the Key (2017).
- The Path to Universal Health Coverage in Bangladesh: Bridging the Gap of Human Resources for Health (2015)
- Population, Family Planning and Reproductive Health Policy Harmonization in Bangladesh (2014)
- Bangladesh - Universal Health Coverage for Inclusive and Sustainable Development. Summary Report (2014)
- Tackling Noncommunicable Diseases in Bangladesh: Now is the time (2013)
- Connecting sectors and systems for health results (2012)
- Capitalizing on the Demographic Transition: Tackling Noncommunicable Diseases in South Asia (2011)
- Private Health Insurance in Egypt in “Global Marketplace for Private Health Insurance: Strength in numbers (2009)”
- Ethiopia: Improving Health Service Delivery (2009)
- Improving Health Service Delivery in Developing Countries: From Evidence to Action (2009)
- Public Expenditure on Health in Egypt in “The Egyptian Economy: Current Challenges and Future Prospects” (2008)
- Private Voluntary Health Insurance in Development: Friend or Foe? (2007)
- Étude du secteur de la santé en Tunisie (2006)
- Tunisia Health Sector Study (2006)
- Egypt and the Millennium Development Goals: Challenges and Opportunities (2005)
- Strengthening, Integrating and Sustaining EPI and Public Health Programs (2001)

Technical Reports

- Pay-for-Performance for Improved Health in Egypt (2010)
- Egypt Health Sector Reform and Financing Review (2004)
- Egypt’s Health Policy Note (2005)
- Voluntary Health Insurance in Egypt (2005)
- Yemen: Health Sector Strategy Note (2000)
- International Strategies for Tropical Disease Treatments: Experiences with Praziquantel (1998)
- The Health Insurance Organization of Egypt: An Analytical Review and Strategy for Reform (1997)
- A Reform Strategy for Primary Care in Egypt (1997)

Articles and Briefs

- Implementation Research: New Imperatives and Opportunities in Global Health (2018).
- The Economic Impact on Households and Nations of NCDs : A Review of Existing Evidence. (2012)
- Engelgau, Michael; Rosenhouse, Sandra; El-Saharty, Sameh; Mahal, Ajay (2011). "The Economic Effect of Noncommunicable Diseases on Households and Nations: A Review of Existing Evidence". Journal of Health Communication. 16: 75–81. doi:10.1080/10810730.2011.601394. hdl:10986/5077. PMID 21916715. S2CID 205742015.
- An effective, well-coordinated response to HIV in Djibouti (2006). HIV/AIDS Getting Results Series. The World Bank
- Akala, Francisca Ayodeji; El-Saharty, Sameh (2006). "Public-health challenges in the Middle East and North Africa". The Lancet. 367 (9515): 961–4. doi:10.1016/S0140-6736(06)68402-X. PMID 16564342. S2CID 28781668.

Project Documents

- HIV/AIDS, Malaria and Tuberculosis Control Project, Implementation Completion Report (2009). The World Bank.
- Morocco: Health Financing and Management Project, Implementation Completion Report (2007). Lead Author. The World Bank.
- Vision 2020 Health Sector Report of the Kingdom of Saudi Arabia (2004). Unpublished.
- Yemen Budget and Expenditures Strengthening Health Chapter (2001). Unpublished.
- Oman: Cost Effectiveness of Health Services (2001). Unpublished.
- Tunisia: Hospital Restructuring Reform Support Project, Implementation Completion and Results Report (2000). Lead Author. The World Bank.
- Étude de la performance des structures sanitaires publiques en Tunisie (2008). Study Team Leader. Université de Montréal.

Videos

- https://www.youtube.com/watch?v=ImbY_pJuLsU
- Dr. Sameh El-Saharty, President of Harvard Arab Alumni Association, at Harvard Arab World Conference 2009: "The Arab World Shaping the Future".
