= Church of the Vera Cruz (Santiago) =

Catholic church in Santiago, Chile

Coordinates: 33°26′20″S 70°38′29″W

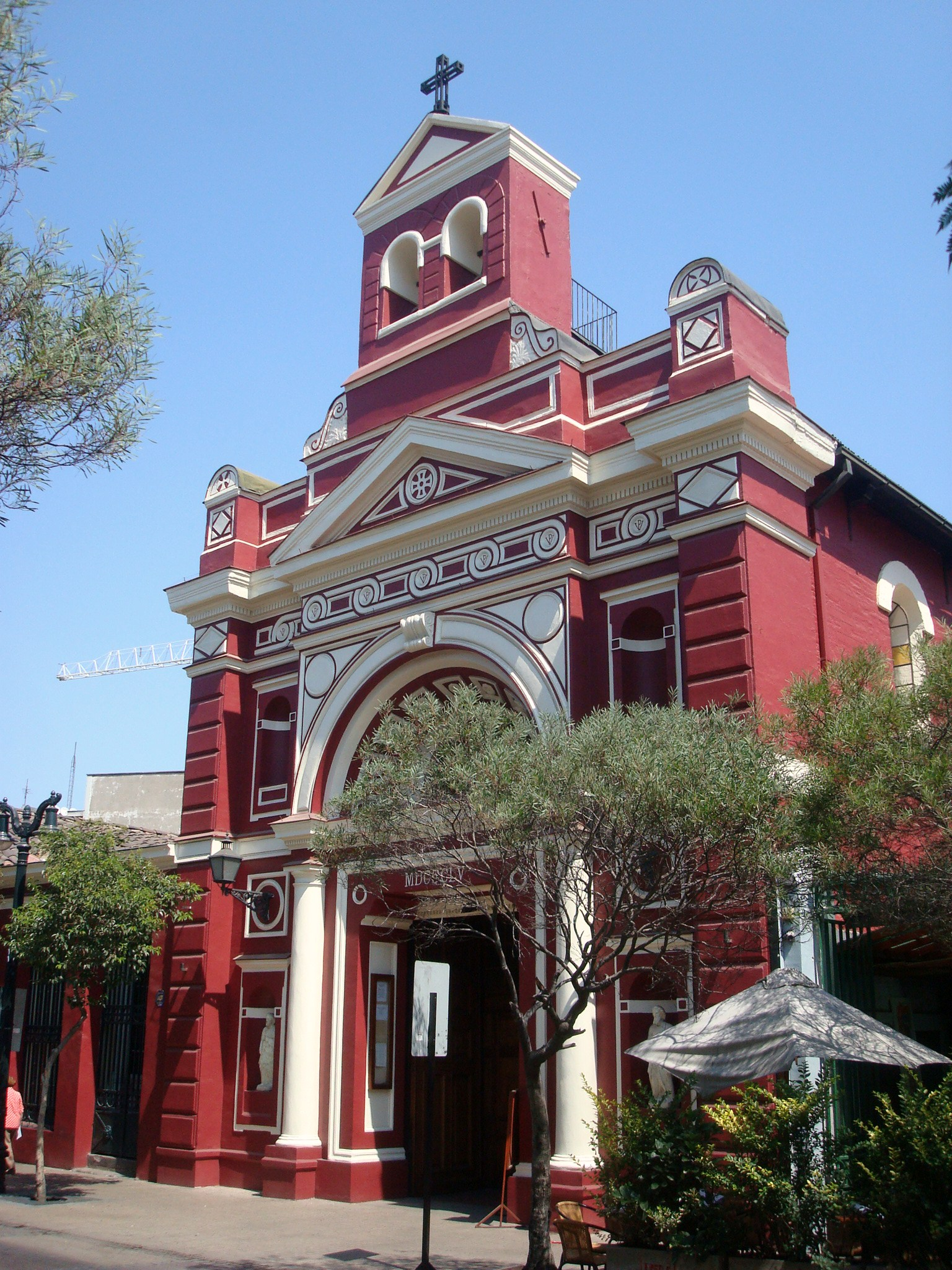
Iglesia de la Vera Cruz

The Iglesia de la Vera Cruz or de la Veracruz (church of Vera Cruz) is a Catholic church located in Barrio Lastarria in the center of Santiago, Chile.

Construction on the church began in 1852 with a proposal by Salvador Tavira to preserve the place where Pedro de Valdivia had lived by building a memorial church for the conquistador, under the guidance of architect Claudio Brunet de Baines. Upon Brunet de Baines’ death in 1855, work was continued by architect Fermín Vivaceta and inaugurated in advance during Chilean Fiestas Patrias celebrations in 1855. The church was completed in 1857.

In 1983 the Iglesia de la Vera Cruz and its parish residence were declared National Monuments by the Ministry of Education.

On November 12, 2019, rioters of the Social Outburst burned down the church and destroyed statues.
