= P. T. Samy =

Indian Tamil writer and screenwriter (1930–2004)

P. T. Samy (1930 – 12 September 2004) was an Indian Tamil writer and screenwriter. Known for his horror fiction, he earned the title "King of Ghost Stories" (Pey Kadhai Mannan). He also wrote under the pseudonym Nanjil P. T. Samy.

== Biography ==
Samy was born in Maravan Kudiyiruppu near Nagercoil in Kanyakumari district, Tamil Nadu. He was married to Lakshmi, with whom he had two daughters: Thangam and Chithra.

== Literary and Film Career ==
Samy began his writing career at the age of 18. Over his lifetime, he authored around 2,000 novels and nearly 500 short stories. Many of his horror stories were serialized in various Tamil weekly magazines.

In addition to novels, he wrote screenplays for Tamil films, including Hotel Sorgam (1975) and Punitha Anthoniyar (1977). He also produced and directed a movie titled Paadum Pachai Kili, which ultimately remained unreleased.

== Awards ==
In recognition of his literary contributions, the Government of Tamil Nadu conferred upon him the Kalaimamani award.
