= Saami =

Saami or SAAMI may refer to:

- Sámi people, the indigenous people of Norway, Sweden, the Kola Peninsula and Finland
- Sámi languages, languages spoken by the Sámi
- Sporting Arms and Ammunition Manufacturers' Institute

== See also ==
- Sami (disambiguation)
