= Tamim Samy =

Egyptian footballer (born 2000)

Tamim Samy تميم سامي
Personal information
- Full name: Tamim Samy Mohamed
- Date of birth: 10 October 2000 (age 26)
- Place of birth: Egypt
- Position: Midfielder

Youth career
- Al Ahli

Senior career*
Years	Team	Apps	(Gls)
2020–2022	Al Ahli	8	(0)
- * Club domestic league appearances and goals

Tamim Samy Mohamed (Arabic: تميم سامي محمد; born 10 January 2000) is an Egyptian professional footballer who plays as a midfielder.

== Career ==
Tamim started his career at the youth team of Al Ahli and represented the club at every level.

== Career statistics ==
=== Club ===
As of 23 December 2020.

Club	Season	League			Cup		Continental		Other		Total	
Club	Season	Division	Apps	Goals	Apps	Goals	Apps	Goals	Apps	Goals	Apps	Goals
Al Ahli	2020–21	Pro League	2	0	4	0	0	0	—		6	0
Career totals			2	0	4	0	0	0	0	0	6	0
