= Samy Yousef =

Egyptian fireworks and special effects director

Samy Yousef سامي يوسف
- Also known as: King of Fireworks
- Born: Samy Yousef; Cairo, Egypt
- Origin: Cairo, Egypt
- Occupations: Fireworks and special Effects Director and programmer.
- Years active: 2001–present
- Website: www.samyyousef.com

Samy Yousef (Arabic: ﺳﺎﻣﯽ ﯾﻮﺳﻒ) is an Egyptian fireworks and special effects director and programmer.

== Early life ==
He was born In Cairo, Egypt. He studied to become an aircraft maintenance engineer (AME). His passion for music drove him to make a career shift into fireworks.

== Career ==
He started his career in 2001 and started his work in fireworks and special effects. He created his own company Starlight. He directed the main firework show in Tamer Hosny concerts and worked with Arab stars including George Wasouf, Ragheb Alama, Nancy Ajram, Haifa Wehbe and Nicole Saba.

In a TV interview Hosny said that he is so proud that Egyptian young men such as Yousef are competing to international standards. Yousef and Hosny concerts achieved success in the Middle East.

Yusef played the main fireworks show with Gorge Wasouf in Egypt. After the show Wasouf said, "You remind me of the world magician, David Copperfield".
