= Sammy Stephens =

American entertainer (born 1957)

- Born: July 10, 1957 (age 69); Montgomery, Alabama, U.S.
- Occupations: Entertainer; radio announcer
- Years active: 1970's - present
- Known for: Television advertisement
- Website: fleamarketmontgomery.com

Sammy Stephens (born 10 July 1957) is an American entertainer from Montgomery, Alabama. He is best known for performing in a television advertisement for Flea Market Montgomery, which originally aired in 2006.

Stephens got his first job as a radio announcer, and also used to sell automobiles in the 70s and 80s. He became owner of Flea Market Montgomery in 2003 when the previous owner put it up for sale due to low sales. Stephens then started advertising it with the slogan "It's just like, it's just like a mini mall!" and became a celebrity due to the ad.

He made a 2006 appearance on The Ellen DeGeneres Show, and the 2026 film Backrooms makes a subtle nod to the commercial, which Stephens said has caused a recommitted interest in it. Stephens also wrote a book titled "I Believe In Me" which released 18 September 2026.
