= Sammi =

Sammi may refer to:

- Sammi (TV series), a 2017 Pakistani drama serial
- Sammi (dance), a dance of Punjab
- Sammi (album), a 1990 album by Sammi Cheng

== Given name ==
- Sammi (given name)

== See also ==
- Sammy (disambiguation)
- Sami (disambiguation)
- Sammie (name)
