= Samy Benmayor =

Chilean painter (born 1956)

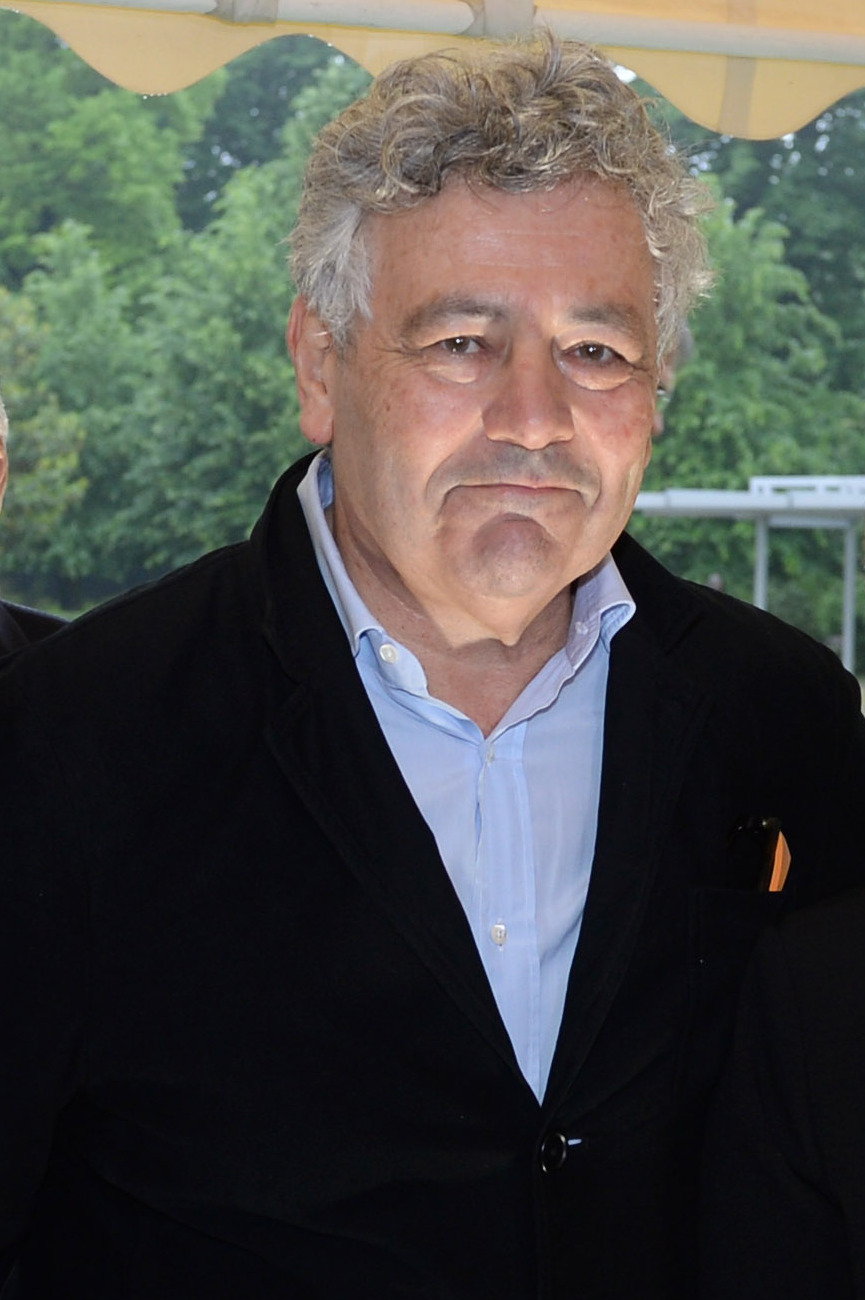
- Born: Samy Mauricio Benmayor Benmayor; January 24, 1956; Santiago, Chile
- Education: University of Chile
- Known for: Painting
- Notable work: Carretelas en la Vega, Retrato de Augusto d'Halmar, Callejon de San Fernando, among others.
- Movement: 80s Generation
- Awards: Second Prize, 1979 Chilean Ministry of Foreign Affairs Diplomatic Academy Contest, Santiago, Chile; Second Prize, 1980 Ministry of Foreign Affairs Art Contest, Santiago, Chile; 1981 Friends of Art Corporation Scholarship, Santiago, Chile; 1982 Friends of Art Corporation Scholarship, Santiago, Chile; Honourable Mention, 1982 LAN Chile National Visual Arts Contest, Plaza Mulato Gil, Santiago, Chile; Honourable Mention, 1985 Valparaíso International Art Biennale, Chile; Second Prize, 1987 “We Promote Art” Contest, Santiago, Chile; Honourable Mention 1987 PREALC Contest, Santiago, Chile; Second Prize, 1987 “We Promote Art” Contest, Santiago, Chile; Scholarship, 1988 U.S. Information Agency and Art Colonies Fund, United States;1989 United States Information Agency Fellowship in Visual Art at the Djerassi Resident Artists Program, Woodside, California, United States; 2000 Altazor Awards, Santiago, Chile; 2003 Marco Bonta Award, Chilean Academy of Fine Arts, Santiago, Chile.

Samy Mauricio Benmayor Benmayor (born 24 January 1956) is a Chilean painter who formed part of the Generation of '80 (Spanish: Generación del '80) movement.

== Biography ==
Samy Benmayor was born in Santiago, Chile, and came from a family of Sephardic Jewish origins. He grew up in a house in the central Santiago highway of Alameda and attended the Liceo Manuel de Salas high school. His father died when he was two years old.

In 1976, Benmayor enrolled at the University of Chile’s Faculty of Arts, where he studied with well-known artists such as Gonzalo Díaz and Rodolfo Opazo, obtaining a Bachelor of Fine Arts in 1982. After his time at university, he was offered scholarships by several institutions to continue his education abroad. In 1981, the Chilean Corporación Amigos del Arte (“Friends of Art Corporation) awarded him scholarship to spend a year in New York City. He was also awarded scholarships by the United States Information Agency and the Foundation for Artist Colonies in 1988 and 1989 to study visual arts at the Djerassi Resident Artists Program in Woodside, California. While in the United States he met Susana Mansilla, who would become his wife and manager.

Benmayor is considered one of the most important artists in Chile, participating in numerous solo and group exhibitions both in Chile and abroad. His work, ‘’Happiness of Childhood’’ (Spanish: “Alegría de la Infancia”), has been used as the logo for the Chile-Imagen project which promotes the work of Chilean artists.

== Style and technique ==
Benmayor belongs to the '80s Generation movement, primarily made up of artists originating from the art school at the University of Chile and linked to the German Neo-expressionism style. This generation has become famous for the innovative art they produced after the 1973 Chilean coup d'état and during the dictatorship period, shocking Chilean society.

Benmayor used traditional materials like oils and watercolours as media to represent childish and playful images.

His work is notable for its symbolism, leaving it to the observer to interpret what his shapes represent.

== Career ==
=== Work ===
- 1983: El incendio (“The Fire”)
- 1987: Gallo Claudio y el paisaje con tetas (“Mr Claudio and Landscape with Tits”
- 1992: Santiago
- 1994: Por donde el viento cruza (“Where the Wind Crosses”
- 2000: El violinista distante (The Distant Violinist”
- 2003: Me aguarda inagotable el universo (“The Inexhaustible Universe Awaits”)
- 2006: Ideas sobre el caos (“Ideas on Chaos”
- 2008: Es aquí o no es aquí (It Is Here or It Is Not Here”)
- 2010: Caminar sobre agua (“To Walk On Water”)

=== Exhibition ===
Solo Exhibition

- 1982 Ariadna Nada Contra la Corriente, Sala Amigos del Arte, Santiago, Chile.
- 1982 Zapateo Americano, Galería Sur, Santiago, Chile.
- 1982 Performance, Centro Cultural Mapocho, Santiago, Chile.
- 1983 Renacimiento de la Pintura o Algo Así, Centro Cultural Mapocho, Santiago, Chile.
- 1984 Te Quiero Vida Mía, se me Nubla la Cabeza y no Puedo Amarte Más, Galería Sur, Santiago, Chile.
- 1986 Instituto Chileno-Norteamericano de Cultura, Concepción, Chile.
- 1986 La Hora Idiota, Instituto Chileno Norteamericano de Cultura, Concepción, Chile.
- 1986 Cabeza Partida, Galería Plástica Tres, Santiago, Chile.
- 1987 12 Artistas de Hoy, Galería Municipal de Arte Valparaíso, Chile.
- 1988 La Odisea, Galería Época, Santiago, Chile.
- 1989 Pinturas, Galería de Arte El Caballo Verde, Concepción, Chile.
- 1989 Viaje al Interior de Mí Mismo, Galería Carmen Waugh, Santiago, Chile.
- 1989 IX Bienal Internacional de Arte de Valparaíso, Municipalidad de Valparaíso, Chile.
- 1991 Arte en Objeto, Galería Praxis, Santiago, Chile.
- 1992 Samy Benmayor, Pinturas y Dibujos, Galería Época, Santiago, Chile.
- 1992 Trabajos Recientes, Galería Época, Santiago, Chile.
- 1992 A la Música, Museo Nacional de Bellas Artes, Santiago, Chile.
- 1993 Trabajos sobre Papel, Galería Plástica Nueva, Santiago, Chile.
- 1995 Últimos Trabajos, Galería A.M.S. Marlborough, Santiago, Chile.
- 2003 La Condición Humana, Galería Ana María Stagno, representante de Galería Marlborough, Santiago, Chile.
- 2006 Sala Blanca del Centro de Extensión de la Universidad Católica, Santiago, Chile.
- 2006 Del Papel al Aire, Centro de Extensión Universidad Católica, Santiago, Chile.
- 2007 Samy Benmayor, Galería AMS Marlborough, Santiago, Chile.
- 2008 Forbidden Pleasures, Galería Marlborough, Nueva York, Estados Unidos.

Joint Exhibitions

- 1979 Centro de Estudios de la Arquitectura CEDLA, Santiago, Chile.
- 1979 Primera Bienal de Arte Universitario, Museo Nacional de Bellas Artes, Santiago, Chile.
- 1980 Tercer Concurso de Pintura del Ministerio de Relaciones Exteriores, Santiago, Chile.
- 1980 8 Pintores Jóvenes, Museo de Arte Contemporáneo, Universidad de Chile, Santiago, Chile.
- 1981 Promoción 80, Sala BHC, Santiago, Chile.
- 1981 V Bienal Internacional de Arte, Valparaíso, Chile.
- 1982 Arch Gallery, Nueva York, Estados Unidos.
- 1982 XIV Bienal de Arte de Alejandría, Egipto.
- 1982 Concurso El Árbol, Museo Nacional de Bellas Artes, Santiago, Chile.
- 1983 30 Chilean Artists, Cayman Gallery, Nueva York, Estados Unidos.
- 1983 VI Bienal de Arte de Valparaíso, Chile.
- 1983 Arte y Textos, Galería Sur, Santiago, Chile.
- 1984 Los Sueños, Galería Plástica Tres, Santiago, Chile.
- 1984 Pintura Joven, Museo de Arte Contemporáneo, Universidad de Chile, Santiago, Chile.
- 1985 Taller Chucre Manzur, Galería La Fachada, Santiago, Chile.
- 1985 Todos Juntos, Galería Carmen Waugh, Santiago, Chile.
- 1985 Revista ¡AARG!, Galería Visuala, Santiago, Chile.
- 1985 Plástica Chilena Horizonte Universal, Museo Nacional de Bellas Artes, Santiago, Chile.
- 1985 VII Bienal Internacional de Arte, Valparaíso, Chile.
- 1985 Gráfica en Las Condes, Instituto Cultural de Las Condes, Santiago, Chile.
- 1986 Semana de Integración Cultural Latinoamericana, Museo de Bellas Artes, Lima, Perú.
- 1986 Saco de Cemento, Galería de Arte Enrico Bucci, Santiago, Chile.
- 1986 Bienal de La Habana, Cuba.
- 1986 Nuestro Mundo Andino, Galería Arte Actual, Santiago, Chile.
- 1986 Ocho Artistas Jóvenes en Pequeño Formato, Galería Praxis, Santiago, Chile.
- 1986 Pintura y Música, Galería Visuala, Santiago, Chile.
- 1986 Del Comic al Historic, La Tira Cómica, Instituto Chileno Alemán, Santiago, Chile.
- 1986 El Caso Matucana de Santiago de Compostura a Valparaíso del Puerto Claro, Sala obra Gruesa, Santiago, Chile.
- 1986 Feliz Navidad, Galería Plástica 3, Santiago, Chile.
- 1987 Ocho Artistas Jóvenes en Pequeño Formato, Galería Praxis, Buenos Aires, Argentina.
- 1987 Pequeño Formato, Galería El Cerro, Santiago, Chile.
- 1987 Chile Vive, Círculo de Bellas Artes, Madrid, España.
- 1987 Los Artistas Presentan a los Artistas, Galería Plástica 3, Santiago, Chile.
- 1987 Bienal Internacional de Cuenca, Ecuador.
- 1987 El Desnudo, Galería Época, Santiago, Chile.
- 1987 Tuco y Tico Homenajean a Matta, Galería Carmen Waugh, Santiago, Chile.
- 1987 Concurso de Pintura Estimulemos el Arte, Premio Guillermo Winter, Centro Casa Verde, Santiago, Chile.
- 1987 Chile: Nuevas Generaciones, Galería Arte Actual, Santiago, Chile.
- 1987 V Concurso El Empleo o su Carencia, PREALC, Galería Carmen Waugh, Santiago, Chile.
- 1987 Dos Continentes pintan América, Galería Carmen Waugh Casa Larga, Santiago, Chile.
- 1987 Deux Continents Peint L'Amérique, Galerie Anysetiers du Roy, Paris, Francia.
- 1987 Exposición y Venta de Pintores y Esculturas Chilenas Federación Wizo de Chile, Instituto Cultural de Las Condes, Santiago, Chile.
- 1987 Seis en el Túnel, Sala El Túnel, Escuela de Arquitectura Universidad Católica, Santiago, Chile.
- 1987 Latin American Challenge, Galería Clara Sujo, New York, Estados Unidos.
- 1987 Chile Nuevas Generaciones, Centro Cultural de la Ciudad de Buenos Aires, Museo Sívori, Buenos Aires, Argentina.
- 1987 12 Artistas de Hoy, Galería Municipal de Arte de Valparaíso, Chile.
- 1988 La Pareja, Galería Época, Santiago, Chile.
- 1988 Santiago, París, Firenze: Aspetti della Giovane Pittura Chilena, Palazzina Tiro al Bolo, Florencia, Italia.
- 1988 Concurso de Pintura El Paisaje Urbano - El Centro de Santiago, Galería Universidad Católica Los Arcos de Bellavista, Santiago, Chile.
- 1988 Cinco Pintores de Chile, Galería Ática, Buenos Aires, Argentina.
- 1988 Pintando la Pintura, Galería del Cerro, Santiago, Chile.
- 1988 10 Artistas Chilenos, La Tertulia Museum, Cali y Bogotá, Colombia.
- 1988 Los Pintores Chilenos por la Democracia, Casa del No, Santiago, Chile.
- 1988 Homenaje a Víctor Hugo Codoceo del Grupo Wurlitzer, Galería Carmen Waugh, Santiago, Chile.
- 1988 Las Generaciones se reúnen, Talleres 619, Santiago, Chile.
- 1989 Homenaje a Salvador Dalí, Galería Lawrence, Santiago, Chile.
- 1989 Final de Gira Chile por Chile, Santiago, Chile.
- 1989 Aquellos Años 80, Museo Nacional de Bellas Artes, Santiago, Chile.
- 1989 IX Bienal Internacional de Arte de Valparaíso, Chile.
- 1989 Museum of Hispanic Contemporary Art M.O.C.H.A., New York, Estados Unidos.
- 1990 Chile por Chile, Universidad de La Serena, Chile.
- 1990 Colectiva en la Intendencia Municipal de Montevideo, Uruguay.
- 1990 Cuarto Encuentro Arte-Industria, Museo Nacional de Bellas Artes, Santiago, Chile.
- 1990 Pintura Chilena, Hoy, Centro Cultural Buenos Aires, Argentina.
- 1990 Derechos Humanos, De la Esperanza a la Creación, Museo Nacional de Bellas Artes, Santiago, Chile.
- 1990 Museo Abierto, Diez Pintores Colección Winter, 1ra. Muestra Itinerante de la Colección Winter, Estaciones del Metro de Santiago y Centros Culturales en Regiones, Chile.
- 1990 The Secret Hidden of the Eye of the Pig Hardwick, Vermont, Estados Unidos.
- 1990 Supermercar'art, Centro de Extensión de la Universidad Católica, Santiago, Chile.
- 1990 Doce Pintores Jóvenes, Calendario Philips, Santiago, Chile.
- 1991 Autorretratos de Pintores Chilenos, Galería Plástica Nueva, Santiago, Chile.
- 1991 Talleres Santa Victoria, Galería Arte Actual, Santiago, Chile.
- 1991 La Capacidad de Asombro frente a la Vida Cotidiana, Centro de Extensión de la Universidad Católica de Chile, Santiago, Chile.
- 1991 Arte en Objeto, Galería Praxis, Santiago, Chile.
- 1991 Encuentro Arte Industria, Museo Nacional de Bellas Artes, Santiago, Chile.
- 1992 Colectiva, Museo Hara, Prefectura de Gunma, Japón.
- 1992 Imágenes Recuperadas, Centro Cultural del Banco Interamericano de Desarrollo BID, Washington, D.C., Estados Unidos.
- 1992 Chile, Cinco Pintores, Pabellón de las Artes, Expo Sevilla 92, Sevilla, España.
- 1992 Chile en Expo Sevilla 92, Centro de Extensión de la Universidad Católica de Chile, Santiago, Chile.
- 1992 Cama, Galería Plástica Nueva San Francisco, Santiago, Chile.
- 1992 National Art Gallery and Museum Building, Wellington, Nueva Zelandia.
- 1992 Museo Maniesh, Moscú, Rusia.
- 1992 Arte para el Vino, Galería de Arte del Otro Sitio, Santiago, Chile.
- 1992 La Colección, Galería de Arte del Centro de Extensión de la Universidad de Chile, Santiago, Chile.
- 1992 Cuatro Pintores Chilenos en Contacto en la Estación, Estación Mapocho, Santiago, Chile.
- 1992 Chile por Chile, Pintores Exponen en Huechuraba, Santiago, Chile.
- 1992 Al Oriente por Santa Victoria, Sala Manuel Robles Gutiérrez, Municipalidad de Renca, Santiago, Chile.
- 1993 Encuentro Ruptura de Última Generación Chile-México, Museo Rufino Tamayo, Ciudad de México, México.
- 1993 Brocha del Siglo XXI, Museo Nacional de Bellas Artes, Santiago, Chile.
- 1993 XLV Bienal de Venecia, Instituto Latinoamericano, Roma, Italia.
- 1993 Diez Años Después, Galería Gabriela Mistral, Ministerio de Educación, Santiago, Chile.
- 1993 Ocho Pintores Chilenos, Galería Tomás Andreu, Santiago, Chile.
- 1993 IV Remate de Pintura Contemporánea de la Fundación Kast, Sala Angelmó, Santiago, Chile.
- 1993 II Encuentro Integra Pintando con los Niños, Museo Nacional de Bellas Artes, Santiago, Chile.
- 1994 La Pittura Cilena Oggi: Samy Benmayor, Bororo Carlos Maturana, Pablo Domínguez, Matías Pinto D´Aguiar, Instituto Ítalo-Latinoamericano ILA, Roma, Italia.
- 1994 Ocho Pintores Chilenos, Museo de Arte Moderno, México, D.F., México.
- 1994 Chile Artes Visuales Hoy, Colección Museo Chileno de Arte Moderno, Salas Nacionales de Cultura Embajada de Chile, Buenos Aires, Argentina.
- 1994 Instituto de Cultura Hispana, Munchen, Alemania.
- 1994 Galería Bevilacqua La Masa, Venecia, Italia.
- 1994 Encuentro Interamericano de Artistas Plásticos, Guadalajara, México.
- 1995 Diez Años de Arte Joven, Centro Cultural de España, Santiago, Chile.
- 1995 Lineart ´95, Gant, Bélgica.
- 1995 Exposición entrega Oficial de Obras Donadas por la Corporación de Amigos del Museo Nacional de Bellas Artes, Museo Nacional de Bellas Artes, Santiago, Chile.
- 1995 Remate de Pinturas y Esculturas para obras benéficas, Galería Jorge Carroza López, Santiago, Chile.
- 1996 Proyecto Chile Imagen, Alegría de Infancia de Benmayor, Galería Gabriela Mistral, Santiago, Chile.
- 1996 Muestra de Pintura Contemporánea, Primer Encuentro de la Cultura Brasil-Chile, Brasilia, Salvador de Bahía y São Paulo, Brasil.
- 1996 Archipiélago Juan Fernández, un viaje interior, Museo Nacional de Bellas Artes, Santiago, Chile.
- 1996 Subasta Pública a Beneficio de la Fundación Roberto Bravo, Sala Angelmó, Santiago, Chile.
- 1996 Nueve Pintores, Galería Balmaceda 1215, Santiago, Chile.
- 1996 Cultura Aventura, Galería Balmaceda 1215, Santiago, Chile.
- 1996 Máscaras, Galería Jorge Carroza López, Santiago, Chile.
- 1996 Galería Tomás Andreu, Santiago, Chile.
- 1997 Arco ´97, Madrid, España.
- 1997 Four Chilean Artists, Marlborough Gallery, New York, Estados Unidos.
- 1997 Introducción al Gesto, Galería de Arte Posada del Corregidor, Santiago, Chile.
- 1997 Dos Pintores Chilenos: Benmayor, Domínguez, Centro Cultural Recoleta, Buenos Aires, Argentina.
- 1997 Concurso El Arte en el Mundo del Café, Galería Plástica Nueva, Santiago, Chile.
- 1997 Pintores Contemporáneos Chilenos, Museo de Arte Moderno de Valdivia, Valdivia. Chile.
- 1997 Expoverano 97, diseña joyas, Rocas de Santo Domingo, Chile.
- 1998 Primera Bienal de Arte Diseño en 360 Grados, Museo Nacional de Bellas Artes, Santiago, Chile.
- 1999 Exposición Chile: Austria, Galería Provincial de Alta Austria, Austria, (Marzo); Landesgalerie Oberösterreich, Berlín, Alemania, (Abril); Kärntner Landesgalerie (Mayo-Junio); Austria, Mailand (Octubre - Noviembre).
- 1999 Lenguajes Contemporáneos en la Plástica Chilena, Universidad de Talca, Chile.
- 1999 22 Artistas en el Tarot, Galería de Arte Isabel Aninat, 1999.
- 2000 Exposición Chile: Austria, Museo Nacional de Bellas Artes, Santiago, Chile.
- 2000 Energía y Luz: Chile 2000, Concurso de Pintura. ENERSIS/Amigos del Arte, Santiago, Chile.
- 2000 El Dibujo en el 2000, Arteabierto, Fundación Bank Boston, Santiago, Chile.
- 2000 Orígenes de Tierra, 6 escultores en cerámica, Galería A, M, S. Marlborough, Santiago, Chile.
- 2001 Inte5roceránica, Colección del Museo de Arte Moderno de Chiloé, Comodoro Rivadavia, Argentina.
- 2004 Alta Temperatura, Cerámica, Sala Gasco Arte Contemporáneo, Santiago, Chile.
- 2004 Exposición Itinerante CCU en la Cultura, Museo Nacional de Bellas Artes, Santiago, Chile.
- 2004 Pintores en su tinta, Galería Trece, Santiago, Chile.
- 2004 Chilean Art Crossing Borders, Ministerio de relaciones Exteriores, Santiago, Chile.
- 2005 Pintores Chilenos Contemporáneos de la 2ª. Mitad del Siglo XX, Museo de América, Madrid. España.
- 2006 Obras Marcadas III, Galería Animal, Santiago, Chile.
- 2007 Benmayor, Bororo, Pinto D'Aguiar, Figuras de los Ochenta, Corporación Cultural de las Condes, Santiago, Chile.
- 2007 Horas Recientes, Galería Vasari, Buenos Aires, Argentina.
- 2007 Arte, Creatividad y Sueños. Universidad de Talca, Chile.
- 2008 Digital Gravura: Colección de Grabados Digitales de Artistas Chilenos Contemporáneos, Museo de Arte Contemporáneo de Valdivia, Chile.
- 2008 Artistas Chilenos por Allende, Museo de la Solidaridad Salvador Allende, Santiago, Chile.
- 2008 Arte en CCU, Primeros 15 Años, Edificio Corporativo CCU, Santiago, Chile.
- 2008 Altazor, Pintores Chilenos y Españoles ilustrando a Huidobro, Museo de América, Madrid, España.
- 2009 Feria ArteBA, presentado por Galería AMS Marlborough, Buenos Aires, Argentina.
- 2009 Tres en la Carretera, Instituto Cervantes, Brasilia, Brasil.
- 2009 Grandes Artistas Contemporáneos, Corporación de Adelanto y Desarrollo de Reñaca, Chile.
- 2010 Exposición Centenario Museo Nacional de Bellas Artes, Santiago, Chile.
- 2010 En Torno al Collage, AMS Marlborough Galería de Arte, Santiago, Chile.
- 2010/11 Obra Útil, Centro Cultural Palacio La Moneda, Santiago, Chile.
- 2011 Galería de Arte Casa Verde, Viña del Mar, Chile.
- 2011/2 Colección 80's MAC, Museo de Arte Contemporáneo, MAC, Universidad de Chile, Santiago, Chile.

=== Awards ===
- 1979, Second Prize, Chilean Ministry of Foreign Affairs Diplomatic Academy Contest, Santiago, Chile.
- 1980, Second Prize, 3rd Painting Contest of the Chilean Ministry of Foreign Affairs, Santiago, Chile.
- 1981 Corporación Amigos del Arte Scholarship, Santiago, Chile.
- 1982 Corporación Amigos del Arte Scholarship, Santiago, Chile.
- 1982, Honourable Mention, LAN Chile National Visual Arts Contest, Plaza Mulato Gil, Santiago, Chile.
- 1985, VII Valparaíso International Art Biennale, Chile.
- 1987, Second Prize, ‘’Estimulemos el Arte’’ contest, Santiago, Chile; PREALC Contest Honourable Mention.
- 1987, Santiago, Chile; Second Place Prize.
- 1987, Guillermo Winter Prize, ‘’Estimulemos el Arte’’ contest, Santiago, Chile.
- 1988 United States Information Agency and the Fund for Artist Colonies Scholarship, United States.
- 1989 United States Information Agency Fellowship in Visual Art at the Djerassi Resident Artists Program, Woodside, California, United States.
- 2000 Altazor Awards, Santiago, Chile.
- 2003 Marco Bonta Award, Chilean Academy of Fine Arts, Santiago, Chile.

=== See also ===
- Agustín Abarca
- Alberto Valenzuela Llanos
- Pablo Burchard
- Alfredo Valenzuela Puelma
