= Barrio Lastarria =

Neighborhood in Santiago, Chile

Coordinates: 33°26′18″S 70°38′25″W

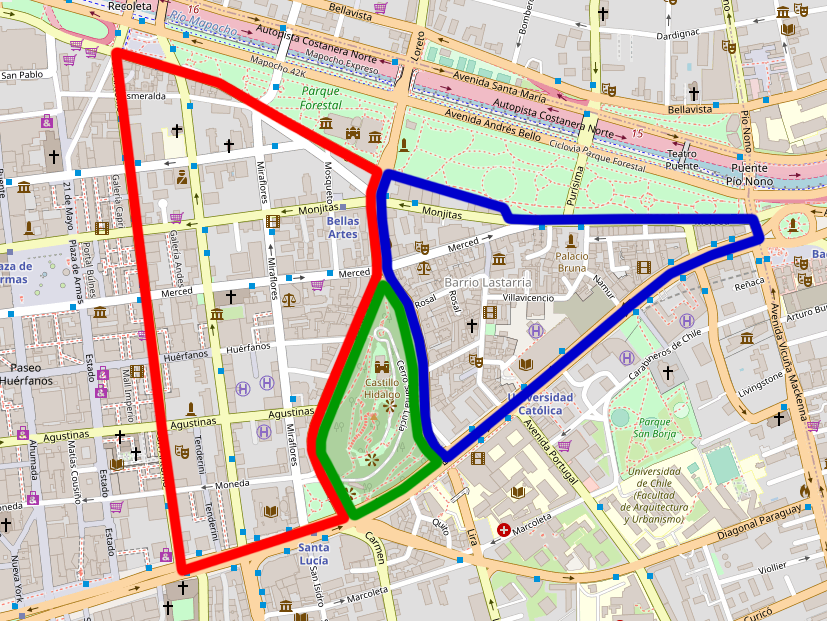
Map of Barrio Lastarria, Barrio Bellas Artes and Cerro Santa Lucía

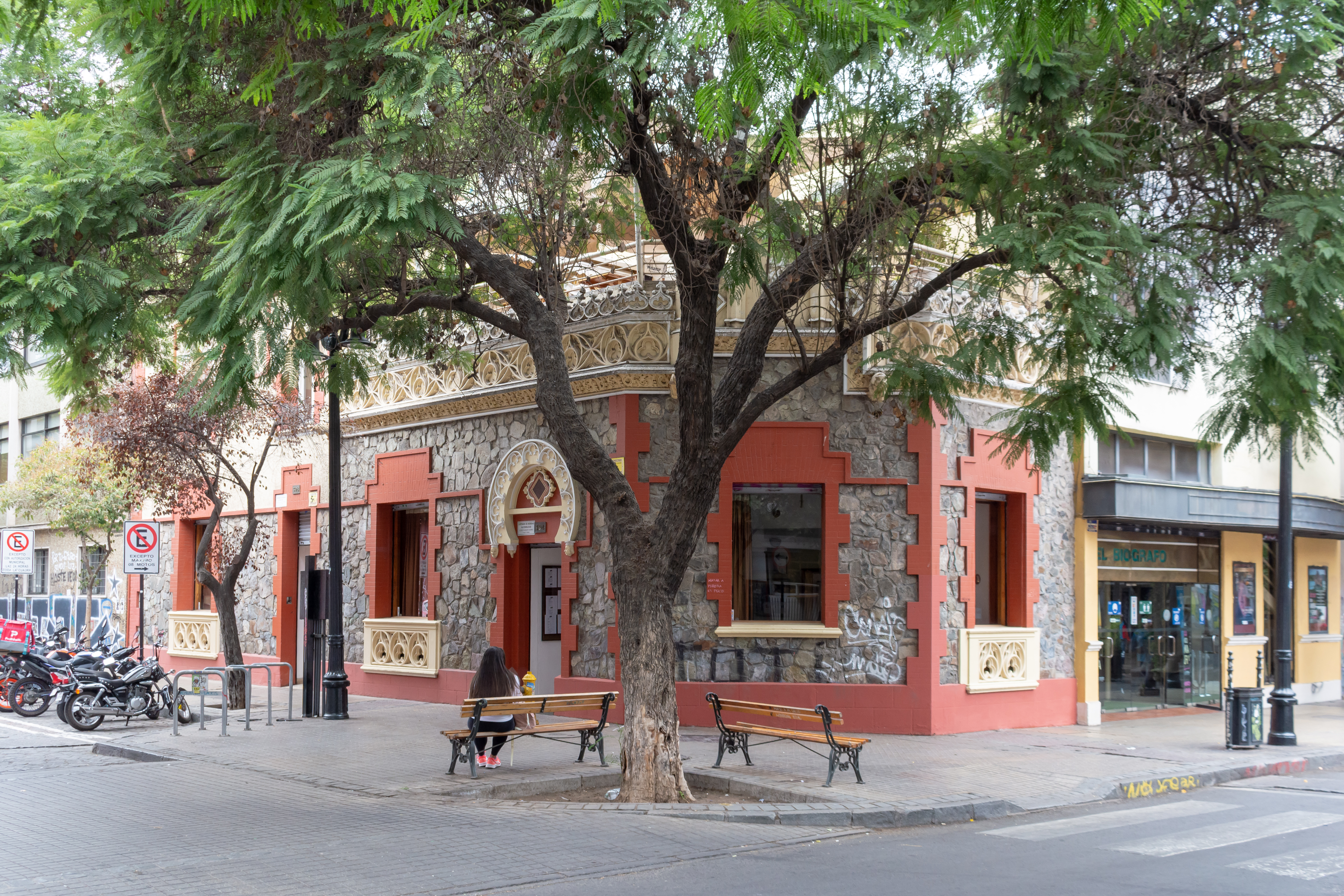
Bar and Cinema "El Biógrafo"

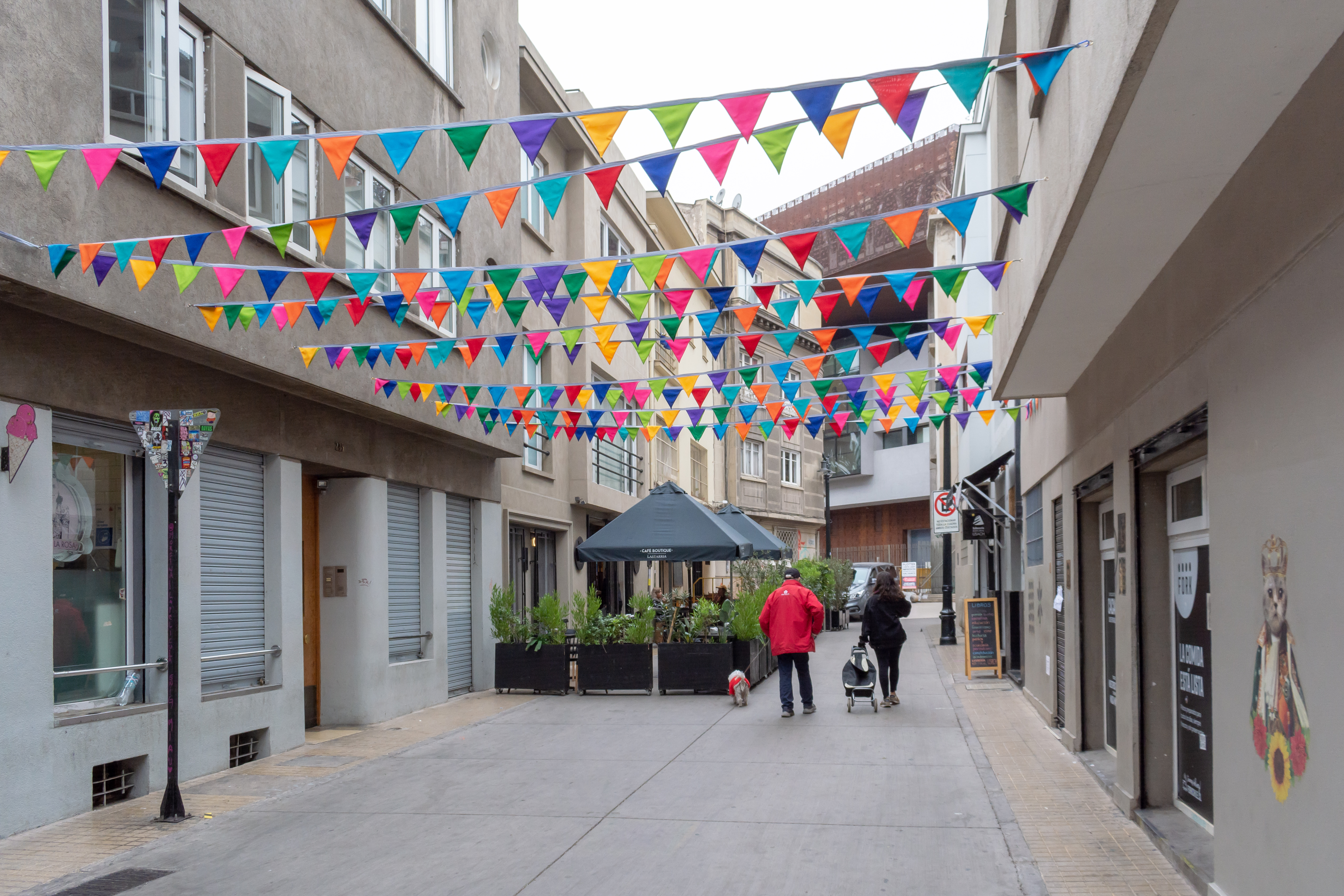
José Ramón Gutiérrez Street

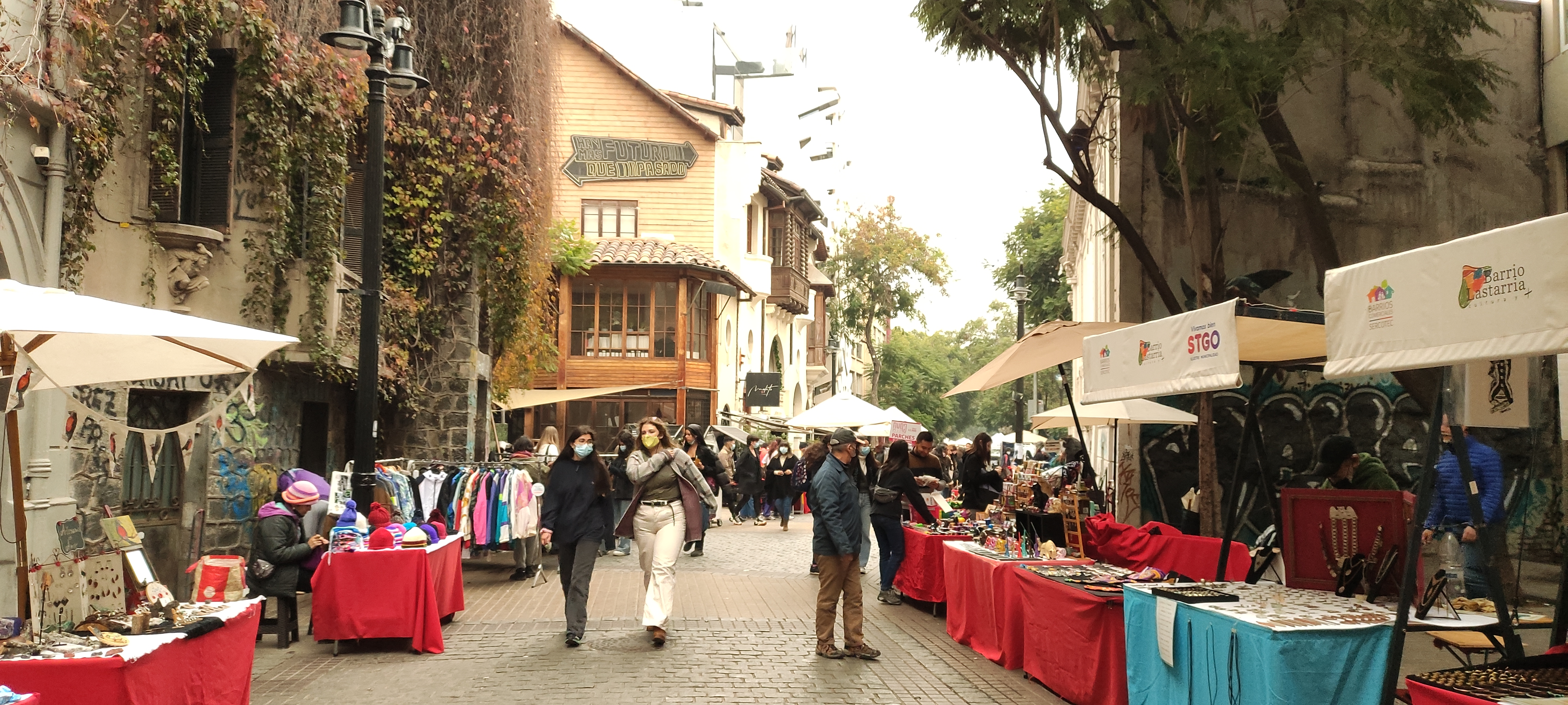
Lastarria boulevard

Barrio Lastarria (Lastarria Neighborhood) is a historical neighborhood in the center of Santiago, Chile. Now a popular tourist hub, Barrio Lastarria is a center for cultural activity, with cinemas, theaters, museums, restaurants and bars. Activities such as festivals and live performances are commonly held throughout the streets of Lastarria given its strong cultural flavor, particularly in J.V. Lastarria street and Parque Forestal.

Barrio Lastarria is bordered by the Alameda and Centro Cultural Gabriela Mistral to the south, Santa Lucía Hill to the west, Parque Forestal to the north and Plaza Baquedano to the east. Metro stations Universidad Católica and Bellas Artes provide direct access.

== History ==
Following the Conquest of Chile by Pedro de Valdivia, this area was left under the control of Bartolomé Blumenthal, a German migrant to Chile, who built a mill on the site. As with many neighborhoods in Santiago's center, Barrio Lastarria was built around a church: in this case, the Iglesia de la Veracruz. Houses were built between the winding streets, notably the house at Plaza Mulato Gil de Castro, built in the beginning of the 19th century. Despite the neighborhood's early origins, the plaza was only built in 1981 due to interest in preserving a series of facades beginning at the historic house of Gil de Castro.

During the 1990s, the neighborhood began a process of restoration with care not to alter its bohemian and intellectual flavor, with a number of cafés, bars and cultural centers appearing towards the end of the decade and the restoration of facades of the Iglesia de la Veracruz in 2001 and 2002. Since then, as an historic area in Santiago, it has been able to maintain its traditional character despite new development. Barrio Lastarria was declared an official Zona Típica by Chile in 1997.

Due to both the number of visitors and LGBT residents, on 5 November 2006, the Movement for Homosexual Integration and Liberation (Movilh) held an act in Parque Forestal to declare the sector as the first gay-friendly neighborhood in Santiago.

== Places of interest ==
- Cafés, cinemas and museums in J.V. Lastarria street.
- Plaza Mulato Gil de Castro.
- Cafés, theaters and cultural centers in Monjitas and Merced streets, including Teatro Ictus and Teatro Lastarria 90.
- Bars, cafés and florists in the area of José Miguel de la Barra-Victoria Subercaseaux, including Mosqueto street.
- Parque Forestal, one of the most beautiful parks in Santiago, inaugurated in 1905. It has several sculptures and the most beautiful water fountain in Santiago, the "Fuente Alemana". There is a brasserie called "Castillo Forestal", in a building from 1910.
- Chilean National Museum of Fine Arts, one of the most beautiful museums in Santiago, which was inaugurated in 1880. Its building is in a Beaux-Arts style.
- Santa Lucía Hill, an old park with tall trees, two castles from 1816 and a large water fountain from 1900.
- Palacio Bruna, a beautiful palace from 1916 in Italian Renaissance style.
- Iglesia de la Veracruz, a church from 1857 in neoclassical style.
- Hotels and hostels on the streets Victoria Subercaseaux and Rosal.
- The Centro Cultural Gabriela Mistral, the first building which can be seen when entering Barrio Lastarria from the Alameda, opened in 2010.

== See also ==
- Parque Forestal
- Chilean National Museum of Fine Arts
- Museo de Arte Contemporáneo (Santiago, Chile)
- Santa Lucía Hill
