= Sammie (name) =

Sammie is a given name. Notable people with the given name include:

- Sammie (born 1987), American singer
- Sammie Abbott (1908–1990), American politician
- Sammie Burroughs (born 1973), American football player
- Sammie Coates (born 1993), American football player
- Sammie Harris (born 1939), American-Canadian football player
- Sammie Haynes (1920-1997), American-Negro baseball athlete
- Sammie Henson (born 1971), American wrestler
- Sammie Lee Hill (born 1986), American football player
- Sammie Johnson (born 1992), Australian rules footballer
- Sammie McLeod (born 2000), English footballer
- Sammie Moreels (born 1965), Belgian racing cyclist
- Sammie Okposo (1971–2022), Nigerian musical artist
- Sammie Smith (born 1967), American football player
- Sammie Stroughter (born 1986), American football player
- Sammie Szmodics (born 1995), English footballer
- Sammie Winmill (born 1948), American actress
- Sammie Wood (born 1991), Australian former football player
