= Samantha =

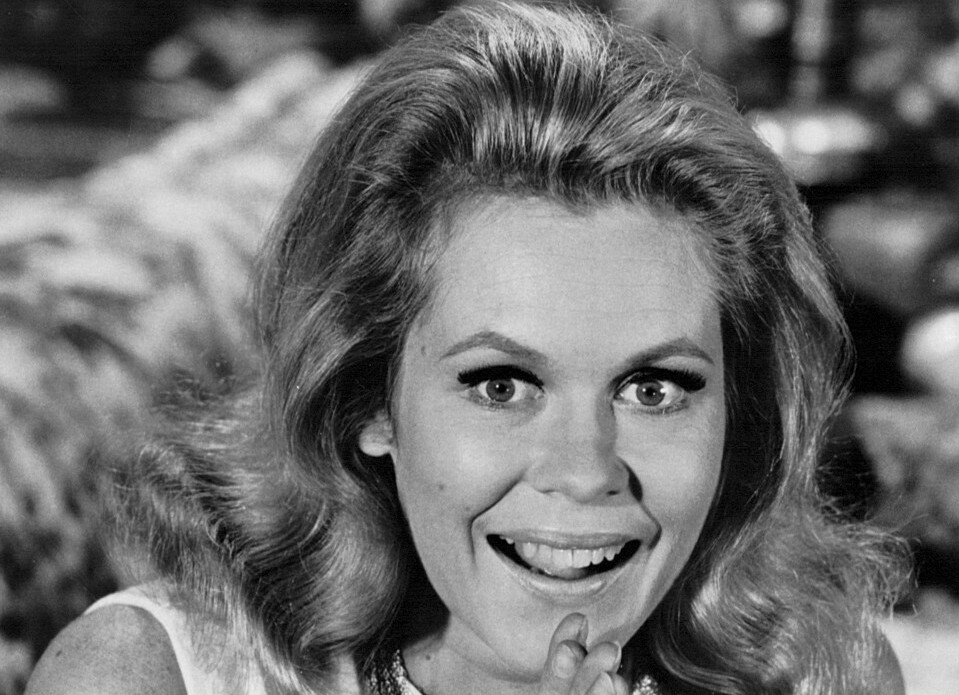
- Elizabeth Montgomery as Samantha Stephens from Bewitched
- Pronunciation: /səˈmænθə/ sə-MAN-thə
- Gender: Primarily feminine
- Language: English

Origin
- Meaning: Possibly a literary, created name derived from a combination of Samuel and Anthea; also a Sri Lankan masculine name derived from the name of the deity Saman

Other names
- Nicknames: Sam, Sami, Sammi, Sammie, Sammy, Sammye
- Related names: Anthea, Samuel, Semanthe, Sigmund; Saman

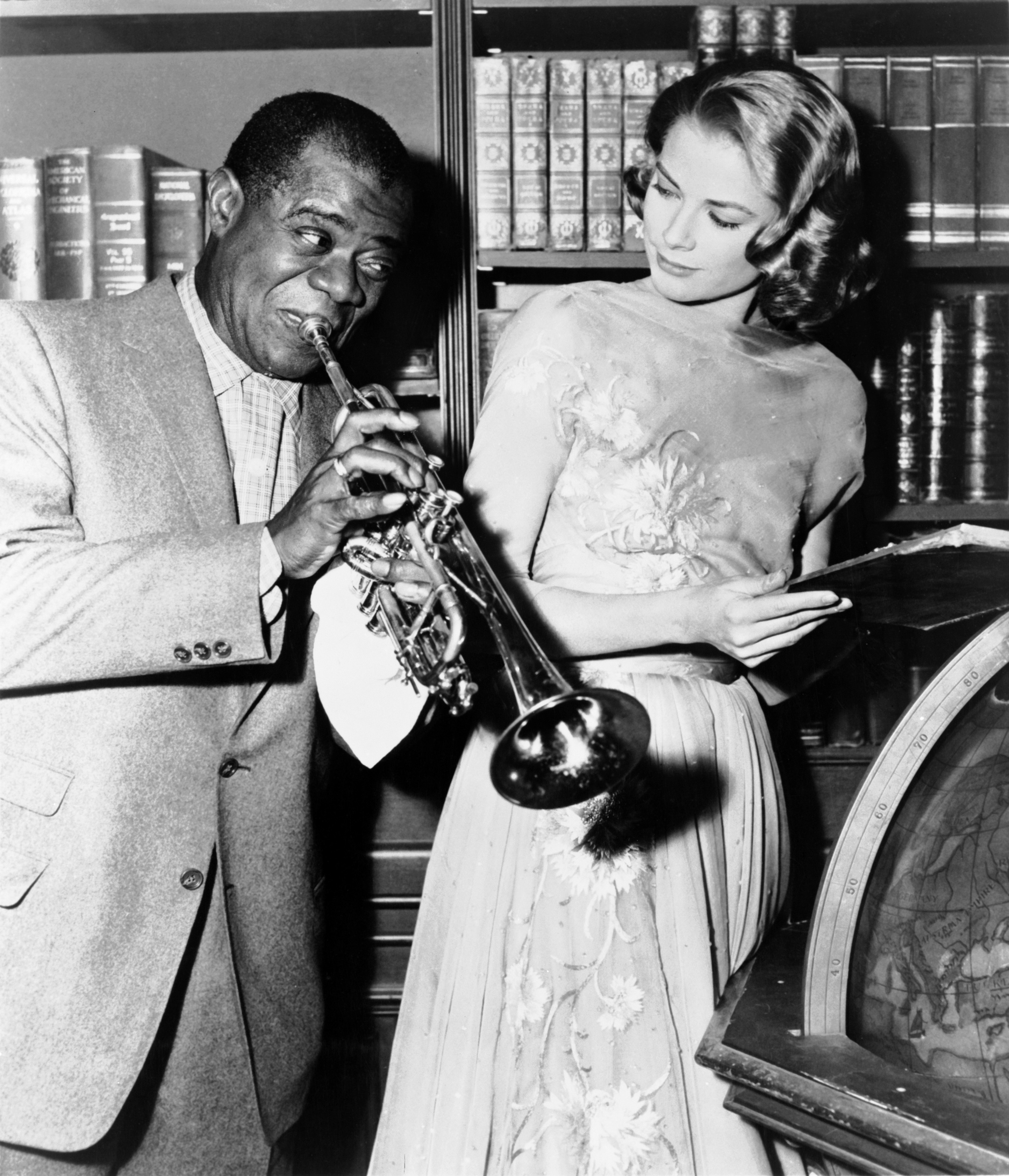
Grace Kelly portrayed Tracy Samantha Lord in the 1956 American romantic comedy musical film High Society. Kelly is pictured with Louis Armstrong on the film set.

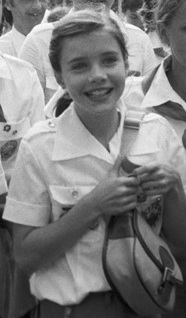
American Samantha Smith (1972–1985) is pictured during her goodwill tour of the Soviet Union in July 1983.

Samantha is an English feminine given name in use since the 17th century that is of uncertain derivation. It is now in popular use worldwide due to various popular culture influences.

== Etymology ==
Some etymologists have suggested Samantha might be a derivative of Semanthe, a similar name likely invented by English playwright Sir John Suckling for a character in his play Aglaura, which was first staged in England in 1637. Semanthe was later used by other English or Irish writers for characters in works of fiction published in the 17th and 18th centuries, including for a character in the 1682 tragic play The Loyal Brother by Irish dramatist Thomas Southerne, a character in the 1690 tragic play The Treacherous Brothers by English playwright George Powell, a character in the 1699 tragic play Friendship Improved by Anglo-Irish dramatist Charles Hopkins, a character in the 1705 tragic play Ulysses by English dramatist Nicholas Rowe, a character in the 1718 historical tragic play Scipo Africanus by English dramatist Charles Beckingham, and in 1758 for an English translation of the works of Françoise d'Aubigné, Marquise de Maintenon. In 1712, the name Semanthe was used in an article in the English periodical The Spectator. Irish poet Mary Barber used the name Samantha in a poem published in her 1734 Poems on Several Occasions.

The etymology of the name Samantha is uncertain. Speculation has suggested an origin from the masculine given name Samuel and anthos, the Greek word for "flower". One theory is that it was a feminine form of Samuel, to which the already existing feminine name Anthea was added. Another theory is that it is an American English version of the Dutch name Sijmentje, a feminine form of Sijmen, the Dutch form of Sigmund. It also might have developed from Semanthe, with influences from other existing names. The name Semanthe was used by 17th- and 18th-century writers along with other character names that sounded Greek but did not have a history of use in Greece, or that sounded exotic to an English audience. It might also have been inspired by existing names from classical mythology, such as Semele and Semiramis in combination with the Greek anthos. The dominant pronunciation of the name might have shifted from Semanthe to Samantha and English speakers might later have associated the name with Samuel. Sementhe might also have been influenced by the Greek mythological Nereid Psamathe, whose name appeared in another 18th-century source as Psamanthe.

Semanthe, Samantha and other phonetic variants such as Samanatha, Samanda, Samanta, Samantah, Samanth, Samanthe, Samanthia, Samanthy, Samentha, Sammantha, Semantha, Semanthee, Simantha, Symantha, Symanthy, Xamantha, Zamantha, and Zemantha were in use from the 18th through the early 20th centuries in England and the United States.

The usual English diminutives of the name are Sam, Sami, Sammi, Sammie, Sammy, and Sammye.

== Masculine name ==
Samantha is also in use as a masculine name in Sri Lanka, where it is one of the forms of the name of the god Saman. The Sri Lankan masculine name is unrelated to the English feminine name.

== Cultural influences ==
As a feminine name, Samantha remained a rare name in the English-speaking world until the 1873 publication of the first novel in a series by American satirist Marietta Holley, featuring the adventures of Samantha Allen, the wife of Josiah Allen. The series led to the rise in the name's popularity, ranking among the top 1,000 names for girls in the United States from 1880, the earliest year for which records are available, to 1902.

The name was out of fashion in the United States for the majority of the first half of the 20th century but reappeared among the top 1,000 names for girls in 1958, when it ranked in 998th position, and in 1959, when it ranked in 993rd place. Those rankings followed the release of the 1956 film High Society, in which Grace Kelly played romantic heroine Tracy Samantha Lord. The movie introduced a song titled "I Love You, Samantha" by the famed American composer Cole Porter.

After 1959, the name fell off the top 1,000 list again until 1964, when it reappeared in 472nd place and leapt another 293 places to 179th place in 1965, coinciding with the 1964 debut of the popular American television show Bewitched, featuring as a lead character a young witch named Samantha Stephens. Names that sounded exotic and appealing were chosen for the young, magical characters on Bewitched, which inspired increased use for many of the names associated with the show.

Another popular culture influence was the song "Lady Samantha", a song about a lonely ghost roaming the hills at night in her satin gown. The song was released in January 1969 by English musician Elton John and covered in 1969 by American band Three Dog Night and released as a single in 1969 by New Zealand singer Shane Hales. The song was a hit in New Zealand.

By the 1980s, the name Samantha no longer seemed exotic but had become familiar throughout the English-speaking world. American schoolgirl Samantha Smith (1972–1985) became famous for her anti-war outreaches during the Cold War between the United States and the Soviet Union, which included a goodwill visit to the USSR in the summer of 1983 which was widely covered by media worldwide. Her August 1985 death in a plane crash was mourned by both Russians and Americans.

Its use for appealing characters of different ages and personalities in various film and television productions has kept the name in the public eye. Influential characters included Samantha Micelli, the tomboyish daughter on the American television sitcom Who's the Boss?, which aired from 1984 to 1992; Samantha Baker, the heroine of the 1984 American coming of age comedy film Sixteen Candles; Samantha Parkington, a wealthy, 10-year-old Edwardian era American Girl character released in 1986 as a doll with an extensive, elaborate wardrobe and featured in children's books and a 2004 film; Samantha Mulder, the alien abductee younger sister of Fox Mulder on the American science fiction drama television series The X-Files, which aired from 1993 to 2002; Samantha Carter, a main character in the Stargate franchise, which aired programs from the late 1990s through 2010; and Samantha Jones, a sexually adventurous public relations professional on the American romantic comedy-drama television series Sex and the City, which aired from 1998 to 2004.

== Popularity ==
The name Samantha has remained consistently popular in the United States since the 1960s. It has ranked among the top 200 names for girls since 1965 and was among the top 100 names for girls between 1976 and 2020. It peaked in popularity between 1986 and 2006, when it was among the ten most popular names for American newborn girls. It reached the pinnacle of its popularity in 1998, when it was the third most popular name for American newborn girls. It has since declined in popularity, but is still well used. In Canada, Samantha was among the top 100 names for girls between 1974 and 2017 and was among the top 10 names for girls between 1988 and 2002. It has declined in popularity but is still in regular use for Canadian girls.

The name also increased in use in other English-speaking countries in the mid-1960s due to influences such as the popular television series Bewitched. Samantha had been in rare, occasional use in the United Kingdom in the 19th century and the first half of the 20th century. As in the United States, the name increased in use following the release of the film High Society in 1956. It was among the top 100 names for British girls in 1964, the year Bewitched first aired, and was among the top 10 names for British girls throughout the 1970s and 1980s. It was among the top 20 names for girls in Australia from the 1970s through the 1990s. In New Zealand, Samantha was among the top 100 names for girls between 1978 and 2015 and was a top 10 name between 1987 and 2001. In Ireland, Samantha was among the top 100 names for girls between 1970 and 1976 and again between 1982 and 1997. The name has since declined in popularity, but continues to be well-used in English-speaking countries.

Samantha has increased in use among Spanish speakers in the 21st century and has been among the most popular names for girls in countries such as Chile and Mexico in the 2020s. It is also a top 10 name for girls in the Philippines in the 2020s.

The name has also been in regular use in Brazil, Czech Republic, France, Italy, Netherlands, and Spain. Samanta is a variant of the name in use in Italy, Latvia, Poland, Portugal, and Spain, and elsewhere.

== Transliterations ==
- Arabic: سمانثا (Samantha)
- Albanian: Samanthë, Samantë
- Armenian: Սամանթա (Samant'a), Սամանտա (Samanta)
- Belarusian: Саманта (Samanta)
- Bulgarian: Саманта (Samanta)
- Chinese Simplified: 萨曼莎 (Sàmànshā)
- Chinese Traditional: 薩曼莎 (Sàmànshā)
- Czech: Samanta
- Danish: Samantha, Samanta
- Dutch: Samantha
- Esperanto: Samanta
- Estonian: Samantha, Samanta
- Finnish: Samantha, Samanta
- French: Samantha
- German: Samantha
- Greek: Σαμάνθα
- Gujarati: સમન્તા (Samantā)
- Hebrew: סמנתה
- Hindi: सामन्था (Sāmanthā)
- Hungarian: Szamanta
- Italian: Samanta
- Indonesian: Samantha
- Japanese: サマンサ (Samansa)
- Kannada: ಸಮಂತಾ (Samantā)
- Khmer: សុមន្ថា (Somontha)
- Korean: 사만다 (Samanda)
- Latvian: Samanta
- Mongolian: Саманта (Samanta)
- Malayalam: സാമന്ത (Saamantha)
- Marathi: समंथा/𑘭𑘦𑘽𑘞𑘰 (Samanthā)
- Norwegian: Samantha, Samanta
- Polish: Samanta
- Persian: سامانتا (Samanta)
- Punjabi: ਸਮੰਥਾ (Samanthā)
- Portuguese: Samanta
- Romanian: Samanta
- Russian: Саманта (Samanta)
- Serbian: Саманта (Samanta)
- Spanish: Samanta
- Swahili: Samandha
- Swedish: Samantha, Samanta
- Tamil: சமாந்தா (Samantha)
- Telugu: సమంతా (Samantā)
- Thai: ซาแมนต้า (Sāmænt̂ā)
- Turkish: Samanta
- Ukrainian: Саманта (Samanta)
- Urdu: سامنتھا (Samantha)
- Yiddish: סאַמאַנטהאַ (Sʼamʼanthʼa)\

== Notable people ==
=== Female ===
- Samantha Agazuma (born 1994), Nigerian cricketer
- Samantha Akinyi (born 1995), Kenyan soccer player
- Samantha Albert (born 1971), Canadian–born Jamaican equestrian
- Samantha Leigh Allen, American journalist and author
- Samantha Andreas, environmental chemist and occupational health and safety expert in the mining industry of Papua New Guinea
- Samantha Arellano (born 1995), Mexican soccer player
- Samantha Arévalo (born 1994), Ecuadorian swimmer
- Samantha Armytage (born 1976), Australian journalist and television news reporter
- Samantha Arnaudo (born 1993), Italian professional racing cyclist
- Samantha Arsenault (born 1981), American swimmer
- Samantha Azzopardi (born 1988), Australian con artist
- Samantha Baines (born 1987), English actress, author, and comedian
- Samantha Barbash, American entrepreneur and former adult entertainment host
- Samantha Barks (born 1990), actress and stage singer
- Samantha Barning (born 1989), Dutch badminton player
- Samantha Barry (born c. 1981 or 1982), Irish journalist and editor
- Samantha Beckinsale (born 1966), English actress
- Samantha Bee (born 1969), Canadian actress and comedian
- Samantha Bentley (born 1987), English pornographic actress
- Samantha Bernardo (born 1992), Filipina beauty queen and television personality
- Samantha Besson (born 1973), Swiss jurist and law professor
- Samantha Bond (born 1961), English actress
- Samantha Boscarino (born 1994), American actress
- Samantha Brennan (born 1964), British-born philosopher and scholar of women's studies
- Samantha Bricio (born 1994), Mexican volleyball player
- Samantha Brick (born 1971), British television producer, writer, and freelance journalist
- Samantha "Sam" Brown (born 1964), English singer, songwriter and musician
- Samantha Brown (born 1970), American television presenter
- Samantha Browne-Walters (born 1991), American actress
- Samantha A. Brugmann, American developmental biologist
- Samantha Bumgarner (1878–1960), American musician
- Samantha Cameron (born 1971), English business executive
- Samantha Casella (born 1981), Italian actress, director, and screenwriter
- Samantha Castillo (born 1980), Venezuelan actress
- Samantha Cesario (born 1993), American figure skater
- Lan Samantha Chang (born 1965), Taiwanese-American novelist and short story writer
- Samantha Susan Chang (born 2000), Canadian soccer player
- Samantha Chapman (born 1977), English makeup artist
- Samantha Cogan (born 1997), Canadian ice hockey player
- Samantha Cole (born 1975), American singer and songwriter
- Samantha Colley (born 1989), English actress
- Samantha Knox Condit (1837–1912), American teacher and Presbyterian missionary
- Samantha Cookes (born 1988), a British fraudster, convicted in England and Ireland
- Samantha Cools (born 1986), Canadian BMX racer
- Samantha Cornish (born 1980), Australian surfer
- Samantha Crain (born 1986), Choctaw Nation singer and songwriter
- Samantha Crawford (born 1995), American tennis player
- Samantha Cristoforetti (born 1977), Italian astronaut
- Samantha Daniels, American professional matchmaker, television personality, television producer, author, and entrepreneur
- Samantha Davies (sailor) (born 1974), English yachtswoman
- Samantha Davies (sprinter) (born 1979), British sprinter
- Samantha "Sammi" Davis (born 1964), English actress
- Samantha Davis (née Burroughs; 1971 – 2024), British actress and co-founder of the charity Little People U.K.
- Samantha De Reviziis (born 1985), Italian web influencer
- Samantha Dixon, English politician
- Samantha Dodd (born 1979), South African track and field athlete
- Samantha Dirks (born 1992), Belizean sprinter
- Samantha Dixon, British politician
- Samantha Dorman (born 1968), American model and actress
- Samantha Dorrance (born 1992), English actress, dancer, and singer
- Samantha Downie (born 1987), Australian model
- Samantha Downing, American author of thriller novels
- Samantha Dubois (1955–1992), Dutch radio presenter
- Samantha Ebert, Canadian Christian music artist
- Samantha Economos (born 1994), Australian rugby league footballer
- Samantha Edwards (athlete) (born 1990), Antigua and Barbuda sprinter
- Samantha Edwards (singer), stage name of Indian singer and vocal coach Samantha Noella
- Samantha Eggar (1939–2025), English actress
- Samantha D. Elliott (born 1975), American federal judge
- Samantha Ellis, British playwright and writer
- Samantha Els (born 1999), South African rugby union player
- Samantha Epasinghe (1967–2021), Sri Lankan actress
- Samantha Ettus (born 1972), American entrepreneur, author, speaker, TV contributor and podcast host
- Samantha Evans (Planetshakers singer), Australian Pentecostal Christian worship leader and singer-songwriter
- Samantha Everton, Australian photographic artist
- Samantha Farquharson (born 1969), English athlete
- Samantha Ferrari (born 1973), Italian rhythmic gymnast
- Samantha Ferris (born 1968), Canadian actress and television reporter
- Samantha Findlay (born 1986), American softball coach and player
- Samantha Fish (born 1989), American singer and songwriter
- Samantha Fisher (curler) (born 1995), Canadian curler
- Samantha Fisher (footballer) (born 1999), Salvadoran footballer
- Samantha Fonti (born 1973), Australian film composer and classically trained violinist
- Samantha Fox (born 1966), English model and singer
- Samantha Fox (1950 – 2020), stage name of American pornographic film and B movie actress Stasia Micula
- Samantha Futerman (born 1987), South Korean–born American activist, actress, director, and writer
- Samantha Gash (born 1984), Australian professional endurance athlete, social entrepreneur, and motivational speaker
- Sami Gayle (born 1996), stage name of American actress Samantha Gail Klitzman
- Samantha Geimer (born 1963), American former model and victim in the Roman Polanski case
- Samantha George, British academic
- Samantha "Sammi" Giancola (born 1987), American television personality
- Samantha Giles (born 1971), English actress and author
- Samantha Giles (golfer) (born 1994), English golfer
- Samantha Gillison (born 1967), Australian–born American writer
- Samantha Ginn, American actress and stage director
- Samantha Gonsalves (born 1996), Jamaican model, singer and songwriter known professionally as Samantha J
- Samantha Gordon (born 2003), American football and soccer player
- Samantha Gorman, American game developer
- Samantha Graham (born 1969), South African politician
- Samantha Greenberg, American founder, managing partner and chief investment officer (CIO) of Margate Capital Management
- Samantha Grey (born 1995), Ecuadorian actress, television presenter, singer and dancer
- Samantha "Sammi" Hanratty (born 1995), American actress
- Samantha Harris (born 1973), American television presenter, model, and entertainment reporter and actress
- Samantha Harris (model) (born 1990), Australian model
- Samantha Harrison (born 1991), New Zealand field hockey player
- Samantha Harvey (born 1975), English novelist
- Samantha Harvey (singer) (born 1993), English pop singer
- Samantha Hayes (born 1984), South African–born New Zealand journalist
- Samantha Heath (1960–2019), British politician
- Samantha Hess (born 1983), American former professional cuddler and author
- Samantha Heyison (born 2005), American Paralympic athlete
- Samantha Hill (actress), Canadian actress
- Samantha Hill (water polo) (born 1992), American water polo goalkeeper
- Samantha Holland (born 1969), English actress
- Samantha Holmes-Domagala (born 1977), Canadian national women's ice hockey player
- Samantha Hoopes (born 1991), American model
- Samantha Hunt (born 1971), American novelist
- Samantha Littlefield Huntley (1865–1949), American portrait artist
- Samantha Inoue-Harte (born 1979), American voice artist
- Samantha Irby (born 1980), American blogger, comedian, and author
- Samantha Isbell (born 1998), Canadian ice hockey player
- Samantha Isler (born 1998), American actress
- Samantha Jade (born 1987), Australian singer and songwriter
- Samantha James (born 1979), American singer and songwriter
- Samantha Katie James (born 1994), Brazilian-born Malaysian actress, model, and beauty pageant titleholder
- Samantha Job, British civil servant
- Samantha John (born circa 1985–1986), American entrepreneur
- Samantha Johnson (born 1989), American musician and announcer, also known as Samantha Irvin
- Samantha Johnson (born 1991), American soccer defender
- Samantha "Sammie" Johnson (born 1992), Australian rules footballer
- Samantha Jones (civil servant), chief operating officer of the Office of the Prime Minister (UK)
- Samantha Josephson (died 2019), American murder victim
- Samantha Joye (born 1965), American oceanographer
- Samantha Judge (born 1978), Scottish field hockey player
- Samantha Juste (1944–2014), English model and television presenter
- Samantha Katz (born 1985), American curator
- Samantha Kelly (born 1997), Northern Irish soccer player
- Samantha Kerkman (born 1974), American politician
- Samantha "Sam" Kerr (born 1993), Australian footballer
- Sam Kerr (Scottish footballer) (born 1999), Scottish footballer
- Samantha Kinghorn (born 1996), Scottish wheelchair racer
- Samantha Kleinberg, American computer scientist
- Samantha Knight (1977–1986?), Australian child murder victim
- Samantha Ko (born 1987), Chinese born actress and model based in Hong Kong and 2008 Miss Hong Kong contestant
- Samantha Kolowratová (born 1996), Czech ice hockey player
- Samantha Lam (equestrian) (born 1978), equestrian
- Samantha Lam (singer) (born 1963), Hong Kong singer and songwriter
- Samantha Lane (born 1979), Australian television personality and sports reporter
- Samantha Lang, English–born Australian director and screenwriter
- Samantha Larson (born 1988), American mountain climber
- Samantha Leigh Martin (born 1985), English child actress
- Samantha Leriche-Gionet (born 1985), Canadian animator, illustrator, and comic strip author
- Samantha Lewes (1952–2002), American actress
- Samantha Lewthwaite (born 1983), Northern Irish terrorist
- Samantha Libreri (born 1982), Irish journalist
- Samantha Lobatto (born 1988), Indian cricketer
- Samantha Logan (born 1996), American actress
- Samantha Lowe (born 1982), English judoka
- Samantha Maiden, Australian political journalist
- Samantha Maloney (born 1975), American musician
- Samantha Markle (born 1964), American mental health counselor and memoirist, half-sister of Meghan, Duchess of Sussex
- Samantha Marshall, Antiguan politician
- Samantha Martin (born 1983), Canadian singer and songwriter
- Samantha Martin (1993–2006), Canadian girl whose death prompted family members to advocate for changes to the provincial child welfare laws
- Samantha Martin (born 1996), Australian professional wrestler known professionally by the ring name Indi Hartwell
- Samantha Massell (born 1990), American actress and singer
- Samantha Mathis (born 1970), American actress
- Samantha May (born 1987), Australian netball player
- Samantha McCarthy, English actress
- Samantha McClung (born c. 1994 or 1995), New Zealand model and beauty pageant titleholder
- Samantha McClymont (born 1986), Australian singer and songwriter
- Samantha McGlone (born 1979), Canadian triathlete
- Samantha McIntosh, New Zealand equestrian
- Samantha Mills (author), American author and archivist
- Samantha Mills (born 1992), Australian diver
- Samantha Mogwe, Botswana musician
- Samantha Monahan (born 1988), American soccer player
- Samantha Moore (born 1988), Canadian singer and songwriter
- Samantha Morton (born 1977), English actress
- Samantha "Sam" Mostyn (born 1965), Australian businesswoman and politician
- Samantha Mugatsia (born 1992), Kenyan actress
- Samantha Mumba (born 1983), Irish singer and actress
- Samantha Munro (born 1990), Canadian actress
- Samantha Murphy (born 1972 – missing 2024), Australian woman who is missing and feared murdered
- Samantha Leshnak Murphy (born 1997), American soccer player
- Samantha Murray (born 1989), English modern pentathlete
- Samantha Murray Sharan (born 1987), British tennis player
- Samantha Navarro (born 1971), Uruguayan composer, guitarist, and singer
- Samantha Nesbit (born 1982), English swimmer
- Samantha Newark (born 1967), English–born American actress, musician, and singer
- Samantha Nierras (born 1989), American–born Filipino soccer player
- Samantha Noble (born 1984), Australian actress
- Samantha Norwood (born 1989), Australian basketball player
- Samantha Nugent (born 1977), American politician
- Samantha Nutt (born 1969), Canadian philanthropist and physician
- Samantha Orobator (born 1988), Nigerian born British drug trafficker
- Samantha Page (born 1983), English newscaster
- Samantha Pankey (born 1983), American rugby player
- Samantha Panlilio (born 1996), Filipina media personality, philanthropist, businesswoman and beauty pageant titleholder
- Samantha Pauly (born c. 1989–90), American actress and singer
- Samantha Paxinos (born 1988), Botswanan swimmer
- Samantha Peszek (born 1991), American gymnast
- Samantha Poling, Scottish investigative journalist
- Samantha Ponder (born 1985), American sportscaster
- Samantha Poolman (born 1991), Australian netball player
- Samantha Power (born 1970), American diplomat and academic
- Samantha Ruth Prabhu (born 1987), Indian actress
- Samantha Prahalis (born 1990), American basketball player
- Samantha Preston (born 1984), Canadian curler
- Samantha Punch, English–Scottish professor
- Samantha Purvis (born 1967), English swimmer
- Samantha Quan (born 1975), Canadian independent film producer and actress
- Samantha Quayle (born 1995), Welsh footballer
- Sam Quek (born 1988), English television personality and former field hockey player
- Samantha Ramautar (born 1987), Guyanese–American cricketer
- Samantha Randle (born 1998), South African swimmer
- Samantha Rapoport, American football player
- Samantha Ratnam (born 1977), English–born Sri Lankan–Australian politician and social worker
- Samantha Rebillet (1972–2017), French–born Australian actress, director, producer, screenwriter, singer, and songwriter
- Samantha Redgrave (born 1994), British rower
- Samantha Retrosi (born 1985), American luger
- Samantha Reeves (born 1979), American tennis player
- Samantha Richards (born 1983), Australian basketball player
- Samantha Richelle (born 1988), Brunei-born Filipina actress, entrepreneur, and fashion designer
- Samantha Ricketts (born 1986), American softball coach and player
- Samantha Ridgewell (born 1996), Canadian ice hockey player
- Samantha Riley (born 1972), Aboriginal Australian swimmer
- Samantha Roberts (born 2000), American–born Antiguan swimmer
- Samantha Robinson (born 1991), British-American actress
- Samantha Ronson (born 1977), English disk jockey, singer, and songwriter
- Samantha Roscoe (born 1995), Australian basketball player
- Samantha Rose (born 1954), Jamaican singer
- Samantha Rowley (born 1988), English actress and model
- Samantha Runnion (1996–2002), American murder victim
- Sam Rushton (born 1965), British Anglican priest
- Samantha Ruth Prabhu (born 1987), Indian actress
- Samantha Salamon, American politician
- Samantha Sang, stage name of Cheryl Lau Sang (born 1951), Australian singer
- Samantha Scaffidi (born 1989), American actress
- Samantha Schmidt (born 2001), Australian Paralympic athlete
- Samantha Schmütz (born 1979), Brazilian actress and comedian
- Samantha Schubert (1969–2016), Malaysian actress, model, and beauty pageant titleholder
- Samantha Scott, New Zealand director
- Samantha Seager (born 1974), British actress
- Samantha Sepulveda (born 1984), Dominican born American police officer and Internet glamour model
- Samantha Shannon (born 1991), British author of dystopian and fantasy fiction
- Samantha Shapiro (born 1993), American gymnast
- Samantha Siddall (born 1982), English actress
- Samantha Skey, American business executive
- Samantha Sloyan (born 1979), American actress
- Samantha Smith (1972–1985), American peace activist and child actress
- Samantha Smith (actress), American actress
- Samantha Smith (gymnast) (born 1992), Canadian gymnast
- Samantha Smith (tennis) (born 1971), English professional tennis player
- Samantha Spiro (born 1968), English actress and singer
- Samantha Stosur (born 1984), Australian tennis player
- Samantha Strauss, Australian screenwriter
- Samantha Tajik (born 1983), Canadian model, actress and television personality
- Samantha Tan (born 1997), Canadian racing driver and team owne
- Samantha Taylor, stage name of Canadian radio and television personality Myroslava Luciw (born 1958)
- Samantha "Sam" Taylor-Johnson (born 1967), British filmmaker
- Samantha Terán (born 1981), Mexican professional female squash player
- Samantha Thornhill, poet, author, educator and producer from Trinidad and Tobago
- Samantha Thornton (born 1966), Australian women's basketball player
- Samantha Tolj (born 1982), Australian actress
- Samantha Tross (born 1968), British consultant surgeon
- Samantha Urbani (born 1987), American singer and songwriter
- Samantha van Diemen (born 2002), Dutch footballer
- Samantha van Wissen (born 1970), Dutch dancer
- Samantha Vice (born 1973), South African philosopher and academic
- Samantha Vinograd (born 1983), American government official and foreign policy commentator
- Samantha Virgo (born 1987), Australian rules footballer
- Samantha Wallace (netball) (born 1994), Trinidad and Tobago netball player
- Samantha Wan (born circa 1990–91), Canadian actress, screenwriter, producer, and web series creator
- Samantha Marie Ware (born 1991), American actress and singer
- Samantha Warriner (born 1971), New Zealand triathlete
- Samantha Watson (born 1999), American middle-distance runner
- Samantha Weinberg, British novelist, journalist, and travel writer
- Samantha Weinstein (1995–2023), Canadian actress
- Samantha Win (born 1991), Canadian actress and former wushu taolu athlete
- Samantha Winders (born 1995), New Zealand netball player
- Samantha Woll (1983 – 2023), American Jewish community leader
- Samantha Worthington (born 1995). American boxer
- Samantha Womack (born 1972), English actress and singer
- Samantha Yeo (born 1997), Singaporean swimmer

=== Male ===
- Samantha de Mel (born 1965), Sri Lankan-born Italian cricketer
- Samantha Dodanwela (born 1970), Sri Lankan cricketer and tea company CEO
- Samantha Fernando (born 1985), Sri Lankan cricketer
- Samantha Sooriyabandara (died 2012), Sri Lankan army officer
- K. V. Samantha Vidyaratna, Sri Lankan politician
- Samantha Vithanage (born c. 1980), student murdered in Sri Lankan university

== Fictional characters ==
- Samantha Anderson, from the TV soap opera As the World Turns
- Sami Brady, from the soap opera Days of Our Lives
- Sammy Jo Carrington, from the TV series Dynasty
- Samantha Carter, from the TV series Stargate SG-1 and related spinoffs
- Samantha Fitzgerald, recurring character from the soap opera Neighbours
- Samantha Groves, from the TV show Person of Interest
- Sam Jones, from the Eighth Doctor Adventures novels
- Samantha Jones, from the TV show Sex and the City
- Sam McCall, from the soap opera General Hospital
- Sam Mitchell, from the soap opera EastEnders
- Samantha Mulder, Fox Mulder's sister from the TV show The X-Files
- Samantha Parkington, from the American Girl series
- Sam Puckett, from the TV show iCarly
- Samantha Spade, from the TV show Without a Trace
- Samantha Stephens, from the TV show Bewitched
- Samantha Taggart, from the TV show ER
- Samantha Eve Wilkins/Atom Eve, from comic book and TV series Invincible
- Samantha Wildman, from the TV show Star Trek: Voyager
