= Sesame Street: Talk, Listen, Connect =

Sesame Street: Talk, Listen, Connect is an educational outreach initiative designed to support military families during time of deployment. The video features Elmo, who faces a difficult transition when his father, Louie, is away. The video doesn't explicitly state that Louie is in the military; instead, it's explained that he'll be away for "lots and lots of days" because he's "working" and "helping people".

While Louie is away, Elmo's mom consoles her son, and lets him know that it's okay to feel nervous about seeing his father again after their time apart. They pass the time while they're waiting by keeping a daily routine. When it is finally time for her husband to come home, Elmo's mom bakes a cake and helps Elmo and his friends decorate for the homecoming.

The special was produced by Sesame Workshop in partnership with Wal-Mart Stores. It has been made available to schools and parenting groups for no charge. The special is also available for download by Sesame Workshop and Akamai Technologies at sesameworkshop.org, and on a DVD made available in a free kit from Military OneSource.

There are three parts to the program. The first helps parents talk to their kids about deployments and ways the family can stay together even while they are apart. For example, every night Elmo and his dad say goodnight to the same moon, even though they aren't in the same place. The second installment deals with injuries, both physical and invisible such as PTSD, and helping families heal together. The final part of the program helps families to talk about death and keeping memories alive. In 2019 Fast Company named Talk, Listen, Connect one of the most socially important productions in Sesame Street's repertoire.

== Credits ==
Executive Producer: Kevin Clash
Producers: Joseph Pipher, Christina Delfico Roberta Morris Purdee
Associate Producer: Liz Sorem,
Line Producer: Deb Mayer
Written by: Christine Ferraro, Joseph Pipher
Directed by: Ken Diego
Associate Director: Leslie Williams
Kevin Clash as Elmo
Martin P. Robinson as Telly
Carmen Osbahr as Rosita
Fran Brill as Elmo's Mom
Bill Barretta as Elmo's Dad
Additional Performers: Matt Vogel, Pam Arciero, Heather Asch, Tyler Bunch
Location cast: Cardona Family, Harris-Tomlin Family, Lopez Family, Mace Family, Nance Family, Slack-Brody Family, Kite Family, Retsch Family, Rogers Family
Jim Henson's Muppet Workshop: Heather Asch, Susan Pitocchi, Rollie Krewson, Michelle Hickey, Jane Pien, Lara MacLean, Chelsea Carter
Songs by: Dave Kinnoin
Production Designer: Bob Phillips
Camera: Jimmy O'Donnell, Frank Biondo, Jerry Cancel
Audio: Chris Prinzivalli, Dan Guachione
Senior Muppet Consultant: Kevin Clash

Additional crew: Mike Pantuso (Senior Graphic Designer), Dan Kelley (Lighting Director), Shawn Havens (Stage Manager), Anna Horton (Production Co-ordinator), Aimee Blackton (Production Assistant), Karen Dancheck (Control room production associate), Maggie Ryan (Scenic Artist), Richie Wirth (Technical Director), Ernie Albritton (video), Chuck Tutino (utilities), Tom Guadarrama (tech manager), Tony Santoro (head electrician), Karen Sunderlin (board operator), Michael Hill (electrician), Ken Purdy (electrician), Steve Ruggiero (head carpenter), Steve Dannenberg (head prop), Jay Sullivan (prop assistant), Curtis Wagner (production assistant), Jon Campbell (production assistant), Leah Baker (production assistant), Joseph Pipher (location director), Rich White (director of photography), Deb Mayer (location manager), Steven Crell (gaffer), Andy Wells (grip), Barron Blackmon (NC crew coordinator), Samantha Martin (production assistant), Bradley Hearn (production assistant), Freddy García (editor), Ralph Kelsey (sound design), Jolee TV Corp. (production services),

Location support team: Morale, Welfare, & Recreation Staff at Fort Bragg, North Carolina, Karen L. Miller (Chief, Child & Youth Services), Sondra McMillan (child development services coordinator), Gloria Tapp (director, Rodriguez Child Development Center), Victoria Russell (administrating assistant, child development services), Jeralene Gerald (family child care), Geraldine Maynard (family child care), Kara Carrier (MWR, Marketing Services Branch), Patricia McCormack (training & curriculum specialist)

Special thanks to: Major General Charles F. Borden, Jr. USMC (RET); Colonel Stephen J. Cozza, M.D., USA (RET); Amy Goyer; Mary M. Keller, Ed.D.; Sylvia Kidd; Michael L. Lopez, Ph.D.; Patty Shinseki; Jean Silvernail, Ed.D.; Janice White; Lynn Chwatsky; David Cohen; Helen Cuesta; Jane Park; Debbie Plate

Post Production services provided by Broadway Video NY
