= High school football =

Gridiron football in secondary schools

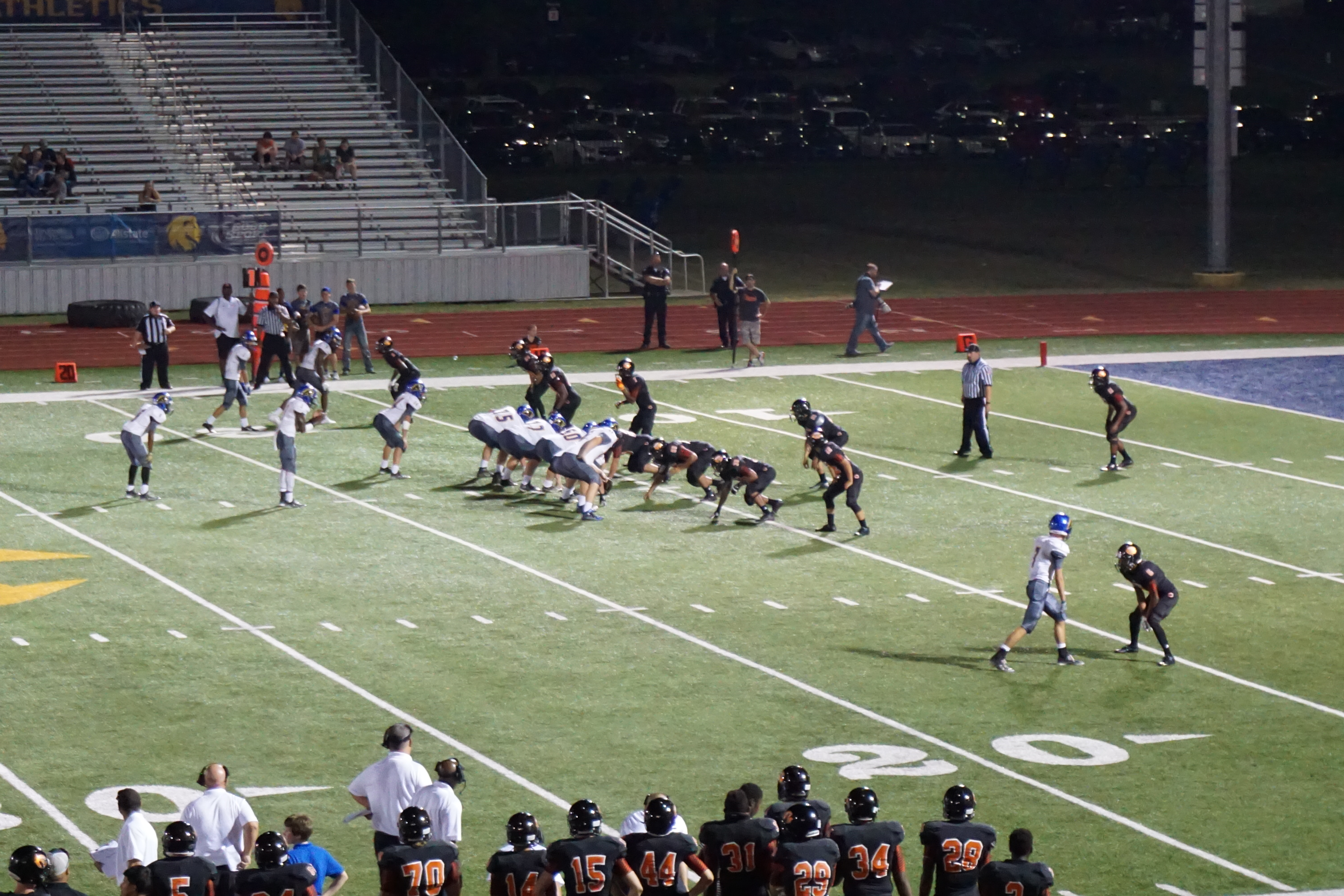
- An August 2015 high school football game in Commerce, Texas
- Country: United States; Canada
- Governing body: NFHS (United States); Football Canada (Canada)
- National teams: United States; Canada
- First played: 1870

National competitions
- High school football national championships (United States)

High school football (French: Football scolaire) is gridiron football played by high school teams in the United States and Canada. It ranks among the most popular interscholastic sports in both countries. It is the level of tackle football that is played before college football in the United States and U Sports football in Canada.

== Rules ==
The National Federation of State High School Associations (NFHS) establishes the rules of high school American football in the United States. In Canada, high school is governed by Football Canada and most schools use Canadian football rules adapted for the high school game except in British Columbia, which uses the NFHS rules.

Since the 2019 high school season, Texas is the only state that does not base its football rules on NFHS rules, instead using NCAA rules with certain exceptions shown below. Through the 2018 season, Massachusetts also based its rules on those of the NCAA, but it adopted NFHS rules in 2019.

With their common ancestry, NFHS rules of high school American football are largely similar to those of college football, though there are some important differences:

- The four quarters are each 12 minutes in length, as opposed to 15 minutes in college and professional football. Texas uses the NFHS 12-minute quarter.
- Kickoffs take place at the kicking team's 40-yard line, as opposed to the 35 in college and the National Football League (NFL); Texas has adopted the NFHS rule.
  - The same rule was used in NFL through 1973; NCAA, 1983.
- Hashmarks are 53 feet, 4 inches apart, dividing the field into thirds. College hashmarks have been 40 feet apart since 1993 (moved in from 53'4"), and NFL hashmarks have been 18 feet, 6 inches apart since 1972 (moved in from 40').
- If an attempted field goal is missed it is treated as a punt, normally it would be a touchback and the opposing team will start at the 20-yard line. However, if it does not enter the end zone, it can be downed or returned as a normal punt.
  - The same rule was used in the NFL through 1973.
- The use of a kicking tee is legal for field goal and extra point attempts. Texas has adopted the NFHS rule, although tees have been banned by the NCAA since 1989.
- Any kick crossing the goal line is automatically a touchback; kicks cannot be returned out of the end zone.
- The spot of placement after all touchbacks—including those resulting from kickoffs and free kicks following a safety—is the 20-yard line of the team receiving possession. In contrast with NCAA rules, which call for the ball to be placed on the receiving team's 25-yard line if a kickoff or free kick after a safety results in a touchback, or NFL rules adopted in 2024, which places a touchback at the 20 or 30 depending upon whether or not the ball hit inside the "landing zone" prior to reaching the end zone.
- All fair catches result in the placement of the ball at the spot of the fair catch. Under NCAA rules, a kickoff or free kick after a safety that ends in a fair catch inside the receiving team's 25-yard line is treated as a touchback, with the ball spotted on the 25.
- Pass interference by the defense results in a 15-yard penalty, but no automatic first down (prior to 2013, the penalty also carried an automatic first down).
- Pass interference by the offense results in a 15-yard penalty, from the previous spot, and no loss of down. The rule was the same as the NCAA until the latter reduced the penalty to 10 yards beginning in 2026.
- The defense cannot return an extra-point attempt for a score. Texas is the lone exception.
- Any defensive player that encroaches the neutral zone, regardless of whether the ball was snapped or not, commits a "dead ball" foul for encroachment. 5-yard penalty from the previous spot.
- Prior to 2013, offensive pass interference resulted in a 15-yard penalty and a loss of down. The loss of down provision was deleted from the rules starting in 2013. In the NFL, offensive pass interference is only 10 yards.
- The use of overtime, and the type of overtime used, is up to the individual state association. NFHS offers a suggested overtime procedure based on the Kansas Playoff, but does not make its provisions mandatory (in Missouri, for instance, overtime possessions start at the 25, instead of the 10 as written in the NFHS rule book). Texas uses NCAA overtime rules as written, which require teams to attempt two-point conversions following touchdowns in the second overtime, then reduce possessions starting with the third overtime to alternating two-point attempts.
- The home team must wear dark-colored jerseys, and the visiting team must wear white jerseys. In the NFL, as well as conference games in the Southeastern Conference, the home team has choice of jersey color. Under general NCAA rules, the home team may wear white with approval of the visiting team, or both teams may wear colored jerseys if they sufficiently contrast.
- Since 2018, the so-called "pop-up kick"—a free kick technique sometimes used for onside kicks, in which the kicker drives the ball directly into the ground so that it bounces high in the air (thus eliminating the possibility of a fair catch)—has been banned.
- Since 2019, NFHS gave its member associations the option to allow replay review in postseason games only. Previously, it prohibited the use of replay review even if the venue had the facilities to support it. In Texas, the public-school sanctioning body, the University Interscholastic League, only allows replay review in state championship games, while the main body governing non-public schools, the Texas Association of Private and Parochial Schools, follows the pre-2019 NFHS practice of banning replay review.
- In 2022, the NFHS adopted an exception to the intentional grounding rule that allows a quarterback who is outside the tackle box to throw the ball away without penalty as long as the pass reaches the line of scrimmage, including its extension beyond the sidelines. The NFL and college football had long used this rule. It also made 0 a legal player number, although that digit remains banned as the first digit of a two-digit number.
- In 2023, the base spot of enforcement for most offensive fouls behind the line of scrimmage changed from the spot of the foul to the previous line of scrimmage. Also, the intentional grounding rule adopted in 2022 was slightly modified; the only player who can benefit from the exception adopted in 2022 is the first player to possess the ball after the snap (almost always the quarterback).
- In 2025, like the NFL, the UFL, and NCAA, Texas starts allowing the two-minute warning once the play ends and up to two minutes remain in the half.
- Like the NCAA & NFL, since 2026 the fair catch kick is legal in Texas, matching the rule used by other states.

At least one unique high school rule has been adopted by college football. In 1996, the overtime rules originally utilized by Kansas high school teams beginning in 1971 were adopted by the NCAA, although the NCAA has made five major modifications. Through the 2018 season, each possession started from the 25-yard line. Since 2021, this remains in force through the first two overtime procedures. In double overtime, teams must attempt a two-point conversion after a touchdown. Secondly, triple overtime & thereafter are two-point conversion attempts instead of possessions from the 25-yard line, and successful attempts are scored as conversions instead of touchdowns.

Thirty-four states have a mercy rule that comes into play during one-sided games after a prescribed scoring margin is surpassed at halftime or any point thereafter. The type of mercy rule varies from state to state, with many using a "continuous clock" after the scoring margin is reached. Except for specific situations, the clock keeps running on plays where the clock would normally stop. Other states end the game once the margin is reached or passed. Texas, for instance, uses a 45-point mercy rule to stop the game only in six-man football; for 11-man football, there is no automatic stoppage but the coaches may mutually agree to use a continuous clock.

== Demographics ==
High school football in the United States is played almost entirely by boys. Over the past decade, girls have made up less than half a percent of the players of American high school football. Eight states have high schools that sanction the non-contact alternative of flag football, but none sanction tackle football for girls, and a 2021 lawsuit in Utah that claimed the state violated Title IX laws by not sanctioning the sport was struck down..

According to the New York Times, in 2006, 70% of high school football players were white and 20% were black. By 2018, those figures were 30% white and 40% black. As of 2016, black youth are nearly three times more likely than white youth to play tackle football.

In the 2010s, participation in high school football decreased in most states across the United States. Wisconsin saw the largest decrease, dropping by nearly a quarter from 2009 to 2019; only seven states saw an increased number of players. Its popularity decline is partly due to risk of injury, particularly concussions. According to The Washington Post, between 2009 and 2019, participation in high school football declined by 9.1%.

== Safety and brain health concerns ==
Robert Cantu, a professor of Neurology and Neurosurgery and co-founder of the CTE Center at the Boston University School of Medicine, believes that children under 14 should not play tackle football. Their brains are not fully developed, and myelin (nerve cell insulation) is at greater risk in shear when the brain is young. Myelination is completed at about 15 years of age. Children also have larger heads relative to their body size and weaker necks.

Chronic traumatic encephalopathy (CTE) is caused by repeated brain trauma, such as concussions and blows to the head that do not produce concussions. It has been found in football players who had played for only a few years, including some who only played at the high school level.

An NFL-funded study reported that high school football players suffered 11.2 concussions per 10,000 games or practices, nearly twice as many as college football players.

According to 2017 study on brains of deceased gridiron football players, 99% of tested brains of NFL players, 88% of CFL players, 64% of semi-professional players, 91% of college football players, and 21% of high school football players had various stages of CTE.

Other common injuries include injuries of legs, arms, and lower back.

== See also ==
- Eight-man football
- High school football national championships
- Nine-man football
- Six-man football
- USA Today All-USA high school football team
- USA Today High School Football Player of the Year
- Utah Girls Tackle Football League
