= Anthea =

- Gender: Female
- Language: Greek

Origin
- Meaning: flower, blossom

Other names
- See also: Thea, Tia

Anthea (Ancient Greek: Ἄνθεια), "blossom" in Greek, was an epithet of the Classical Greek goddess Hera, the goddess of marriage, women, and family, and the protector of women during childbirth. Anthea is used as a female given name in English.

== Mythology ==
- Anthea, a queen of Argolid, also named Stheneboea.

== People ==
- Anthea Askey (1933–1999), British actress
- Anthea Bell (1936–2018), British translator of literary works
- Anthea Benton, British television commercial and music video director
- Anthea Butler (born 1960), American professor
- Anthea Fraser (born 1930), novelist
- Anthea Joseph (1924–1981), British publisher
- Anthea Larken (born 1938), British director of the Women's Royal Naval Service
- Anthea Millett (1941–2022), British health administrator
- Anthea Phillipps (born 1956), British botanist
- Anthea Redfern (born 1948), British television host
- Anthea Stewart (born 1944), Zimbabwean field hockey player
- Anthea Sylbert (born 1937), American costume designer
- Anthea Turner (born 1960), British television presenter and media personality

== Fictional characters ==
- Anthea, home world (which is dying due lack of water) of the fictitious alien Thomas Jerome Newton, the protagonist of Walter Tevis' sci-fi novel The Man Who Fell to Earth
- Anthea Hopper, a minor supporting character in the French animated show, Code Lyoko and Code Lyoko: Evolution
- In Men Behaving Badly, Valerie Minifie plays Anthea, an employee at Gary's security firm
- In BBC'S Sherlock (TV series), the assistant of Mycroft Holmes calls herself Anthea
- Anthy Himemiya is one of the main characters of the manga Revolutionary Girl Utena
- Anthea is a queen of a desert tribe of "Speaking Mountain" in The Secret of the Sahara
- Anthea is one of the main characters in the Psammead trilogy by E. Nesbit
- Anthea in 2023 superhero film Shazam! Fury of the Gods, played by Rachel Zegler
- Anthea Stonem is the mother of the starring character Effy Stonem in the British TV-show Skins

== Other ==
- Anthea, a container ship

== See also ==
- Samantha, presumed to be a combination of Samuel and Anthea
