= Water skiing at the 2009 World Games – Women's three event =

Waterskiing women's three event at the 2009 World Games
- Venue: Lotus Lake, Kaohsiung, Taiwan
- Date: 22–25 July 2009
- Competitors: 12 from 11 nations

Medalists
gold medal	(Belgium) Kate Adriaensen
silver medal	(France) Manon Costard
bronze medal	(United States) Caroline Hensley

The women's three event competition in water skiing at the 2009 World Games took place from 22 to 25 July 2009 at the Lotus Lake in Kaohsiung, Taiwan.

== Competition format ==
A total of 12 athletes entered the competition. In this competition athletes compete in three events: slalom, tricks and jump. Best six athletes from preliminary round qualifies to the final.

== Results ==
=== Preliminary ===
Rank	Athlete	Nation	Slalom	Jump	Trick	Overall	Note
1	Kate Adriaensen	Belgium	5.00/55/12.00	42.1m	6060	2797.65	Q
2	Manon Costard	France	2.50/55/12.00	42.1m	6390	2714.90	Q
3	Caroline Hensley	United States	3.00/55/12.00	38.0m	6440	2647.75	Q
4	Megan Ross de Siegert	New Zealand	0.50/55/12.00	46.2m	4910	2603.84	Q
5	Jenna Mielzynski	Canada	3.50/55/13.00	42.2m	5180	2405.80	Q
6	Jutta Lammi	Finland	4.00/55/13.00	46.3m	4080	2392.16	Q
7	Barbora Kolesárová	Slovakia	1.00/55/12.00	40.7m	2930	2125.91	
8	Olivia McDonald	United States	4.00/55/13.00	30.0m	5420	2043.92	
9	Cristina de Medrano	Spain	4.00/55/13.00	41.4m	2680	2007.53	
10	Marie Vympranietsova	Greece	5.00/55/13.00	44.8m	890	1880.11	
11	Samantha Martin	South Africa	3.00/55/13.00	32.2m	1700	1506.89	
12	Saaya Hirosawa	Japan	3.50/55/16.00	39.5m	1670	1354.83	

=== Final ===
Rank	Athlete	Nation	Slalom	Jump	Trick	Overall
1st place, gold medalist(s)	Kate Adriaensen	Belgium	1.00/55/11.25	41.4m	6490	2824.15
2nd place, silver medalist(s)	Manon Costard	France	2.00/55/12.00	40.6m	6790	2678.57
3rd place, bronze medalist(s)	Caroline Hensley	United States	5.00/55/12.00	39.4m	5670	2567.68
4	Jenna Mielzynski	Canada	4.50/55/13.00	43.6m	3460	2182.00
5	Jutta Lammi	Finland	4.00/55/13.00	45.1m	3050	2158.87
6	Megan Ross de Siegert	New Zealand	1.00/55/11.25	37.9m	2210	2069.25
