= Housewife (band) =

Canadian indie rock artist

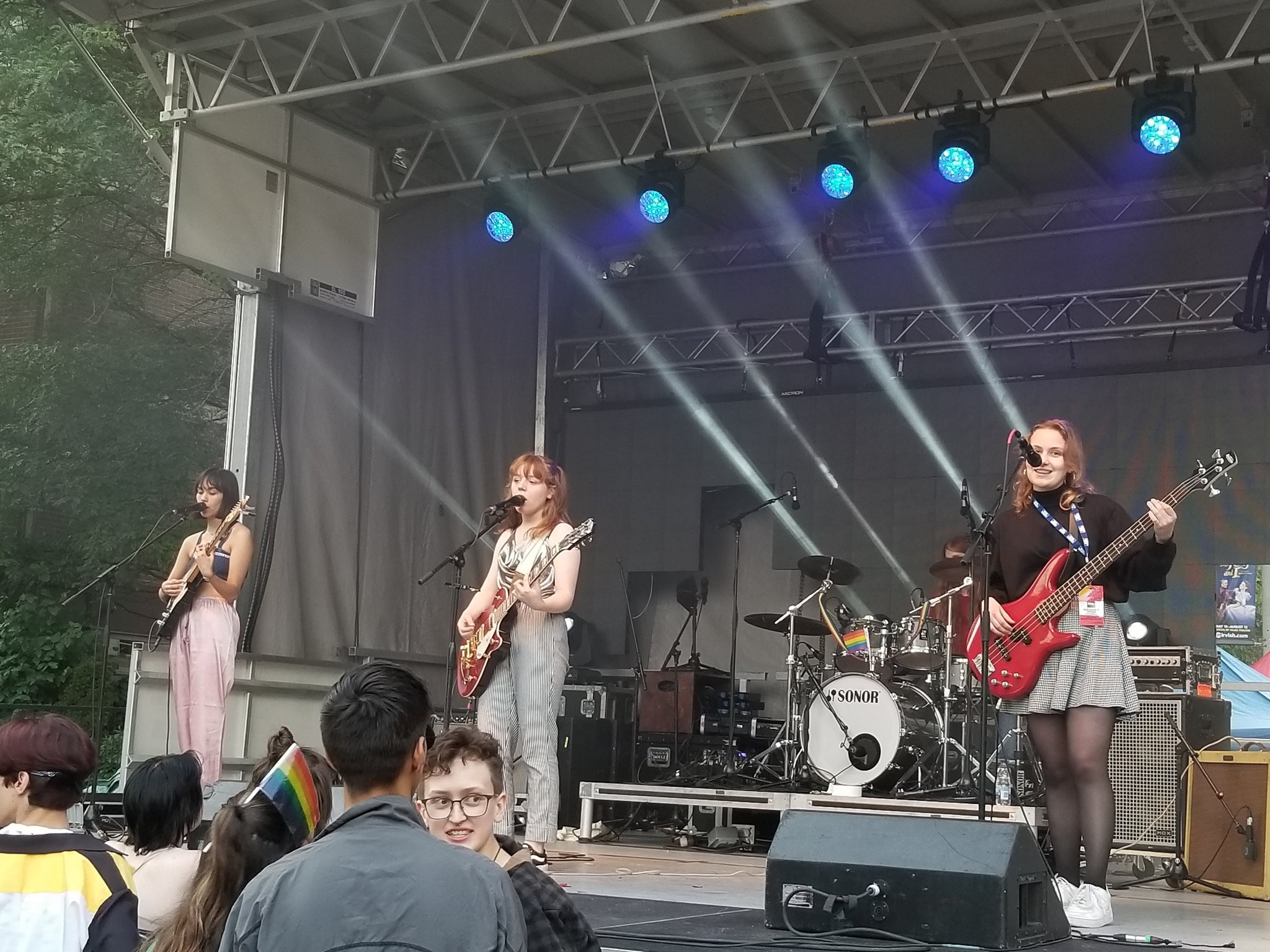
- Housewife play Toronto Pride in 2018

Background information
- Also known as: Moscow Apartment (2017–2022)
- Origin: Toronto, Ontario, Canada
- Genres: Indie rock
- Years active: 2017–present
- Members: Brighid Fry

Housewife (formerly Moscow Apartment) is the Canadian indie rock musical project of Brighid Fry based in Toronto, Ontario, Canada. Its founding members are Brighid Fry (guitar, vocals; formerly of Kingdom of Birds) and Pascale Padilla (guitar, vocals), with a number of guest players joining them for live shows and recordings. Padilla left the band in late 2022.

The band's debut self-titled EP was launched September 30, 2017, following the release of the video for their first single, Annie, the month prior. Better Daughter, their sophomore EP, was released on Hidden Pony Records on July 10, 2020.

The band was formerly known as Moscow Apartment, until announcing a name change on April 26, 2022. As of March 2023, Housewife is now a solo project of Brighid Fry.

Brighid Fry is neurodivergent, bisexual, and non-binary. She identifies as a third-generation queer and uses they/she pronouns.

== Self-titled EP ==
Housewife's self-titled debut was produced by Samantha Martin of Delta Sugar, three of the tracks were mixed by Guillermo Subauste, and features Michael Louis Johnson, member of Rambunctious, former lead singer of The New Kings, and brother of Gordie Johnson on trumpet. Blues and Roots Radio noted in a review by Phillip Bridle that "the maturity in the song writing and musical skills of the pair is quite remarkable.... [T]his first EP of five beautifully crafted songs is surely an indicator of special things to come." Shortly thereafter, NOW Magazine included Housewife in its list of Toronto Musicians to Watch in 2018.

== Better Daughter ==
Released on July 10, 2020, the majority of Better Daughter was produced by Fry and Padilla in collaboration with Guillermo Subauste of Pacha Sound, who also worked as the recording engineer, while the song Two Timer was produced by Grammy-winning producer and recording engineer Vance Powell. In writing the EP, Housewife also collaborated with Kevin Drew of Broken Social Scene and Juno-winner Chin Inejti. The EP was mixed by Scotty Hard.

Exclaim! magazine wrote in its review that the album helps "solidify what's been obvious for years: that everyone ought to know and care about Moscow Apartment," and CBC named it one of the "22 albums you need to hear" in the summer of 2020.

== Activism ==
Throughout her career, Brighid Fry has engaged in climate activism. She has supported many organizations and projects, including Climate Justice Toronto, Unist'ot'en Camp, No Music on a Dead Planet, The Jellyfish Project, and Earth/Percent. She also helped establish the Canadian chapter of Music Declares Emergency. In 2022, she was named a Top Environmentalist Under 25 by The Starfish, a Canadian youth climate leadership organization.

== Awards ==
- 2018, Slaight Music's national It's Your Shot contest.
- 2018, Canadian Songwriting Competition - Under 18 category.
- 2017, Best Young Songwriters at the Toronto Independent Music Awards.
- 2017, Young Performers of the Year at the Canadian Folk Music Awards.

== Members ==
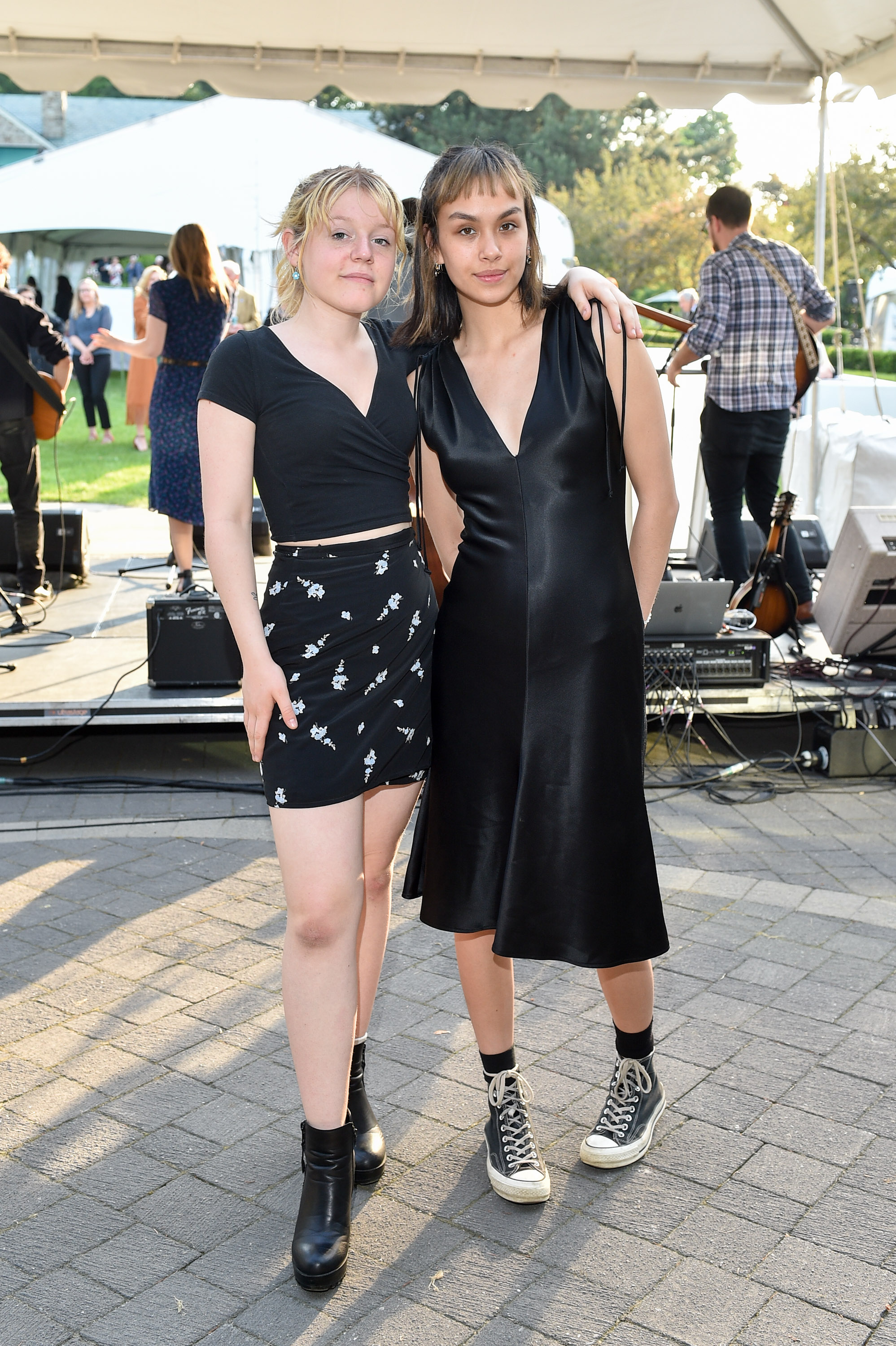
Fry and Padilla in 2019.

Current members

- Brighid Fry – vocals, guitar, violin

Former members

- Pascale Padilla – vocals, guitar, electric bass

== Discography ==
=== Albums ===
- Self-titled EP (Independently released; 2017)
- Better Daughter (Hidden Pony; 2020)
- You'll Be Forgiven (Hazel Street Records, 2022)
- Girl Of The Hour (Independently released, 2025)
