= Santa guerra =

2022 film by Samantha Casella

- Directed by: Samantha Casella
- Written by: Samantha Casella, Antonio Micciulli
- Screenplay by: Samantha Casella
- Starring: Eugenia Costantini: Woman; Emma Quartullo: Woman in ghostly house; Ekaterina Buscemi: Woman wanders in Hades; Samantha Casella: Ghost / Ananke; Maria Grazia Cucinotta: Moira Cloto; Simona Lisi: Moira Lachesi; Chioma Ukwu: Moira Atropo; Isabella Tedesco: Fortune-seller; Diego Pagotto: Ade
- Cinematography: Samantha Casella
- Edited by: Paola Merisi
- Music by: Enrico Maria Paolillo
- Production company: The Shadows Factory
- Release date: 2022
- Running time: 78 minutes
- Country: Italy
- Language: IT

Santa guerra is a 2022 film directed by Samantha Casella.

== Plot ==
A woman falls down into a timeless place where her subconscious tries to process the trauma that crushes her. While a part of herself is stuck in a ghostly mansion and her double wanders in an ancestral place, the woman will reach a painful awareness.

== Cast ==
The absolute protagonist is played by Eugenia Costantini. The film also represents the debut of Emma Quartullo, daughter of the actress Elena Sofia Ricci and the director Pino Quartullo. The director, Samatha Casella played a ghost who on a symbolic level represents the protagonist's sense of guilt. Also present in the cast are Ekaterina Buscemi, Simona Lisi and Maria Grazia Cucinotta in a new and mythological role: a moira.

== Reception ==
Presented as a special event during the 79° Festival del Cinema di Venezia Santa guerra has participated in numerous international festivals, winning over 500 awards in 55 different countries. Since September 2023 it has been in the Prime Video Italian catalogue.

== Critical response ==
Santa guerra was received favorably by critics. In the magazine and newspaper, Nocturno, the film received a 5-star rating. Editor Davide Comotti defined it as "a film about human pain; experimental that teems with artistic fury, with the Dionysian power of images and gloomy music combined with the Apollonian rigor of colorful photography and staging". Positive reviews also came from Massimo Nardin on Il profumo della voce vita, Enrico Maria Prati on Meer and Enzo Latronico on The Way Magazine.

The review on International Motion Pictures Awards is indicative: "Santa Guerra travels between modern theatrical experiences and silver screen presentations bringing unique and hybrid experiences, incorporating elements of both traditional movie-making and modern theater style, creating an immersive and captivating experience for audiences".
