= Amy Nelson =

American entrepreneur

- Born: 1980 (age 45–46)
- Education: NYU School of Law (JD); Emory University (BA)
- Occupations: Entrepreneur, lawyer, writer
- Known for: CEO of The Riveter
- Spouse: Carleton Nelson
- Children: 4

Amy Nelson (née Sterner; born 1980) is an American entrepreneur, lawyer, and writer. In January 2017, she founded The Riveter, an organization that provided work space and other services to support working women. She is the co-host of the podcast, What's Her Story With Sam & Amy.

As an author, she has been published in Inc. Magazine and Forbes.

== Early life and education ==
Amy Sterner Nelson was born in 1980 and grew up in Ohio. Nelson's mother was a middle school teacher and her father an attorney. Nelson developed an interest in politics in her youth, going door-to-door for political campaigns. Her first jobs were as a nanny, then as a waitress. Nelson earned a Bachelor's degree in International Studies from Emory University. While attending college, Nelson interned at the Carter Center, where she accepted a full-time job upon graduation. She then earned a J.D. in law from the NYU School of Law.

== Career ==
After graduating from NYU Law, Nelson worked in law and politics. Initially, she did corporate litigation for Cahill Gordon & Reindel. She also worked in fundraising for pro-choice political candidates.

Nelson moved to Seattle in 2012 with Carleton Phillip Nelson, her then-boyfriend and now-husband, who was employed as an executive in Amazon.com's real estate acquisitions & development organization from 2012 until he was terminated in May 2019.

Nelson co-founded The Riveter in 2017 with Kim Peltola, a social worker. Nelson raised $700,000 in seed capital and opened The Riveter's first office that May in Seattle. The Riveter is named after Rosie the Riveter, who was a symbol for female factory workers during World War II.

== Podcast ==
Nelson is the co-host of the podcast, What's Her Story With Sam & Amy with fellow entrepreneur Samantha Ettus. The podcast features interviews with women at the top of their field and has included Gloria Steinem, Abby Wambach, Randi Zuckerberg, Huma Abedin, and Melinda Gates.

== Personal life ==
Nelson has four daughters with her husband, Carleton Nelson.

On May 8, 2025, Nelson posted to her personal Instagram account an allegation that, in 2020, Amazon CEO Jeff Bezos leveraged his political influence to pursue federal criminal charges against her spouse, Carleton Nelson, for unspecified violations of his then-Amazon employment contract. Amy Nelson alleged these actions by Bezos led to a midnight armed raid of her home by federal agents while her daughters, then under age 6, were in the home, and were terrorized. Nelson stated she and Carleton had to sell their house to pay for lawyers, and that charges were never filed, and that the federal judge dropped all charges. Amy Nelson said she made the post after being ignored by Washington's governor and federal lawmakers.
