= Utah Girls Football League =

All-girls youth American football league

- Abbreviation: GFL
- Formation: Founded 2015
- Founded at: Salt Lake County, Utah
- Type: Youth Sports League
- Legal status: Nonprofit
- Region served: Salt Lake County
- Commissioner: Crystal Sacco
- Board of directors: Samantha Rapoport et al.
- Key people: Sam Gordon
- Affiliations: USA Football
- Website: utahgirlstacklefootball.com

The Utah Girls Tackle Football League (GFL) is the first all-girls youth American football league in the world, founded as a nonprofit in March 2015. The league is currently in its thirteenth season. The GFL consists of three age divisions: elementary (grades three–six), junior high (grades seven–nine), and a high school division (grades ten–twelve). There are over 600 players spread across 32 teams; 35% of them are minorities. Everyone in the league apart from the match officials is a volunteer.

== History ==
=== Creation as a nonprofit ===
In 2014, two years after Sam Gordon's football highlight video went viral, she posed a question at a school assembly she attended, asking which girls would be interested in playing tackle football and reportedly "dozens of hands went up." This interest caused Gordon and her father, an attorney, to look into starting a league of their own. They contacted a former offensive lineman for the Utah Jynx Women's Football team, Crystal Sacco, who was already making steps to start an all-girls youth league in the area. They also called USA Football Director of Football Development Samantha Rapoport for help. Sacco would go on to become the commissioner of the league while Gordon's father and Rapoport would become a member of the board of directors.

In early 2015, with the assistance of a few local professional women's football players, Gordon and her father founded the GFL as a non-profit. It is the first known full-contact all-girls youth tackle football league ever. According to the organizers, the league filled up completely just three days after sign-ups began. Around 50 fifth and sixth-graders took part in the inaugural season, which was just four-weeks, compared to the current nine-week season.

=== Media coverage ===
The GFL gained national acclaim when it started in 2015, and has seen nationwide news coverage. The league has received both praise and criticism. While most news organizations initially reported on it being the first of its kind, some commentators have taken a specific stance on the league. ESPN, for example, aired a segment in which the safety of the league was called into question. In the segment, they brought on a medical doctor who said that there is heightened risk of concussions for children and perhaps even further risk for girls. Others, however, have pushed praise onto the league, encouraging their audience to sign up.

In 2020, two teams from the GFL played an exhibition match as the NFL Pro Bowl half time show. The teams had players representing seventeen different Utah high schools. Roman Oben, the NFL Vice President of Football Development, said about the GFL that "It’s been really commendable to see the growth of the sport. We’re aware these women are paying to play for pads, insurance, equipment and travel and they should be applauded.”

A documentary short about the league titled First Down was released in 2022 at multiple film festivals across the U.S. and received a favorable review in the Washington Post.

=== Lawsuit to create public school-affiliated all-girls tackle football teams ===
In June 2017, Sam Gordon and her father, alongside five other GFL players (and their parents), filed a class action lawsuit against three local school districts to force public high schools to offer girls football in the Salt Lake Valley. Gordon spoke about the difficulties that girls who want to play tackle football face, saying that when she played with boys "I had a target on my back, and it was in the shape of a ponytail." As the only girl in the Ute conference youth tackle football league, she heard parents from opposing teams urge their kids to “beat the girl.”

The lawsuit used Title IX as justification and received national coverage. The two-week trial featured testimony from girls who played and suffered a range of experiences, including assault and exclusion. Gordon and the plaintiffs claimed girls were not offered equal opportunities in the districts’ football teams, and should be offered separate football teams. As the girls were from the Granite, Jordan, and Canyons school district, those were the districts that were named as the defendants (in addition to the Utah Attorney General's Office).

In 2021, U.S. District Court Judge Howard Nielson ruled in favor of the defendants. The judge stated that Utah school districts are not required to create a separate sport for girls interested in playing football, as girls who want to play can play on the existing boys teams. Nielson went on to say that “The mere fact that Defendants do not provide separate football teams for boys and girls is not discrimination on the basis of sex. To the contrary, it is undisputed that girls are permitted to play football and do in fact play, albeit in extremely limited numbers." The Federal ruling judged that constitutional and Title IX rights were not violated by the defendants.

The lawsuit was appealed in 2022 to the Tenth Circuit. The appeals court stated that the original decision by the lower courts was an error and the case should be reclassified. Additionally, the appeals court said that the lower courts should have allowed the lawsuit to be a class action lawsuit. The appeals court sent the case back to the district court for further review. In 2023, the appeal was settled. A joint statement by the plaintiffs said that "the settlement agreement represents the parties’ efforts to advance the goals of Title IX by increasing opportunities for girls to participate in sports and by increasing participation by girls in sports." The settlement required several policy changes and actions for the school districts, including the creation of a Title IX athletic coordinator, requiring every junior high and high school in Canyons, Jordan, and Granite districts to have a liaison that handles emerging sports, as well as a recurring survey by the districts asking students about their level of interest in sports. The districts must aim to boost the presence of girls sports across elementary, middle, junior, and high school tiers. Such initiatives involve organizing registration gatherings, featuring sports details in various communication channels, showcasing girls club sports and emerging sports on school websites, and allowing students who are interested in girls sports to apply to become a student-led club sport and be able to request the use of school facilities.

== Districts ==
GFL is split into six districts, Herriman, Bingham, Riverton/Utah County, West Jordan/Copper Hills, West Granite/Davis County, and Canyons/East Granite/Murray. Each division consists of three teams which are further divided by age: elementary (grades 3–6), junior high (grades 7–9), and High School (grades 10–12). These districts compete against one another at their corresponding age level.

== Corporate structure ==
The GFL is a 501(c)(3) nonprofit organization and is run by a board of directors. The league's board of directors is responsible for electing a Commissioner. The current president of the league is Crystal Sacco. According to the rules of the GFL, the president is "responsible for coordinating and running meetings, maintaining league records, initiating the scheduling process, revising and distributing league rules, monitoring the registration process, and acting as the final arbiter of any disputes that might arise."

Any formal propositions to change any league methods, procedures, systems or other major decisions are affirmed by a greater part vote of the Board of Directors present at the meeting at which the vote is taken. If necessary, the Commissioner of the league will vote to break the tie. The GFL only employees volunteers who do not receive pay for their work/contributions to the league, the exception to this being the official game referees. Coaches for the league are volunteers and must be USA Football Heads-Up certified.

== See also ==
- Powderpuff (sports)
- Women's gridiron football
