= The Riveter (organization) =

The Riveter is a for-profit company headquartered in Seattle, Washington. It is focused on supporting women in the workplace. It engages in political advocacy, provides office and work space, hosts events, and publishes content. It was named after Rosie the Riveter, a symbol for women in the workplace during World War II.

The Riveter was founded in July 2017 in Seattle by former attorney Amy Nelson and former social worker Kim Peltola, who later left the company, using $700,000 in initial funding. In 2018, it raised $4.75 million in seed funding and $15 million in Series A funding. In mid-2019, The Riveter acquired a Denver coworking space business called Women in Kind. The Riveter expanded to 9 locations by late 2019.

The Riveter's gathering and work spaces consisted of offices and large co-working spaces filled with desks. Some locations also provided fitness events, workshops, and other services. In 2017, The Riveter's membership is about 75 percent female and 25 percent male.

During the summer of 2020, The Riveter shuttered its physical locations, due to the COVID-19 pandemic, launching its digital community online.
