= Katabasis (film) =

2024 film by Samantha Casella

- Directed by: Samantha Casella
- Written by: Samantha Casella
- Screenplay by: Samantha Casella
- Starring: Samantha Casella: Nora; Francesco Leone: Aron; Bruno Bilotta: Jaob; Marina Rocco: Anna; Jacopo Olmo Antinori: dead son; Vanessa Marini: Clarissa
- Cinematography: Samantha Casella
- Edited by: Paola Merisi
- Music by: Dino Gervasoni
- Production company: The Shadows Factory
- Release date: 2024
- Running time: 100 minutes
- Country: Italy
- Language: IT

Katabasis is a 2024 film written, directed by, and starring by Samantha Casella.

== Plot ==
After a childhood abuse she had repressed, Nora has developed an indecipherable personality. Nora has a secret relationship with Aron, a young orphan who has become a star. Only those who frequent the house where they live know about Nora and Aron's relationship: a villa, a theater of secrets, lies, deceit, and presences. Weighing down on everyone's fate is an entity Nora summoned during a childhood nightmare, which she asked to enter that realm.

== Cast ==
Samantha Casella plays Nora. She stars alongside Francesco Leone, Bruno Bilotta, Jacopo Olmo Antinori, and the young Reyson Grumelli. Marina Rocco and Vanessa Marini also appear in supporting roles.

== Reception ==
Presented in a special event at the 81st Venice Film Festival, Katabasis has won several international awards. It has been available on Prime Video since March 2026.

== Symbolisms ==
Katabasis refers to a living person's descent into the afterlife. Presenting "Katabasis," a mythological interpretation, it metaphorizes the myth of Hades and Persephone. Kidnapped by Hades and taken to the underworld, she remained prisoner there after agreeing to eat six pomegranate seeds. A predominantly symbolic and esoteric dimension is insinuated in "Katabasis," as the (non-)place in which the characters gravitate is an ambiguous, dark, ephemeral world, a sort of antechamber to a hell where one loses oneself, one's integrity, one's soul.

Finally, "Katabasis" presents the theme of abuse; as repressed childhood abuse leads a woman to relive relationships that recall what she had suffered within unhealthy, toxic contexts. To survive, she herself becomes an abusive, indecipherable person. The villa where the film takes place, Villa Laderchi, also known as Villa Rotonda, is also a key feature of the film. Its architectural motifs and circular and octagonal geometric shapes conceal esoteric references, clearly inspired by Masonic art.

Mario Zanoni's sculptures are in perfect harmony with the film's themes. Some of them represent various major arcana of the Tarot: the Tower, the Hanged Man, and the Devil. The large chessboard is composed of bronzes representing the pieces of the strategy game.
