= Powderpuff (sports) =

High school sport

In the United States and Canada, powderpuffs are football games (ice hockey games in Canada) which include flag football or touch football games between girls from senior classes or cross-town school rivals. If tickets are required to enter and concessions are offered, sales typically go to charity, the senior class, or to a dance. The games are an annual tradition at many high schools and universities. The term originates from the powder puff, the soft material used for the application of cosmetic face powder. The games usually occur before homecoming.

== History ==
=== Eastern State Teachers College ===
It is not clear when the first powderpuff football game was played. There is photographic evidence of it being played as early as 1931 at Western State College of Colorado (now Western State Colorado University) in Gunnison, Colorado. One of the first well-documented powderpuff football games was played on October 20, 1945, at Eastern State Teachers College, in Madison, South Dakota. Eastern State Teachers College had previously canceled many campus activities for the duration of World War II. Among these events were the annual homecoming celebration and intercollegiate sports, including football.

With the signing of the unconditional surrender by Japan on September 2, 1945, the war officially came to an end, Homecoming was once again on the schedule at Eastern State Teachers College. A traditional football game seemed out of the question since due to the wartime military draft, just 3 men had enrolled for the fall term that year.

"A bunch of us were sitting around after gym class and we thought, if we’re going to have Homecoming, we've got to have a football game," said Susie Lowry, who was a freshman at Eastern in 1945. "We decided we should have a game of our own." Robert C. Nelles, a freshman at Eastern that year, was on the Homecoming committee. The very idea of women playing football "was enough to curl your teeth", he wrote in an account of the game for the History of Lake County, but nonetheless, the committee gave its approval for a game with all women players.

There were two groups of female Eastern students at the time: those who lived at their homes in Madison while attending classes on campus and those from surrounding small towns who lived in the dormitories. The 23 female players divided into two teams, known as the Townies and the Dormies. On game day, the teams were designated Blue and Gold teams, respectively, which were Eastern’s school colors.

Leota Van Ornum, Eastern's physical education teacher, served as coach for both teams. Robert Ormseth, a coach at a local high school, served as her assistant. "A fairly large group of spectators showed great interest and enthusiasm during the game," according to The Eastern, the campus newspaper. The 23 players constituted almost half of Eastern’s enrollment of 53 that term. Robert Nelles and Paul Tommeraasen, two of the three male students, were pressed into service as game officials.

“We tried to be real, with huddles and all that," said Lowry. "There was a lot of clowning around. A few of us fell down, just to make it look good, but it wasn’t really rough or anything." First time players proved more adept at defense than offense, with each team being held scoreless until the game's final minute, when Doris Treloar of the Gold team scored a touchdown. This was immediately answered by Nancy Baughman of the Blue. Professor A.E. Swan, the librarian serving as the referee, considered that an opportune moment to end the contest on an amiable note. In its story about the game, the Madison Daily Leader dubbed the two teams "The Powderpuff and Rouge Elevens". The name was suggested because the women chose to poke fun at themselves by staying on the field at halftime and putting on fresh makeup before the amused spectators.

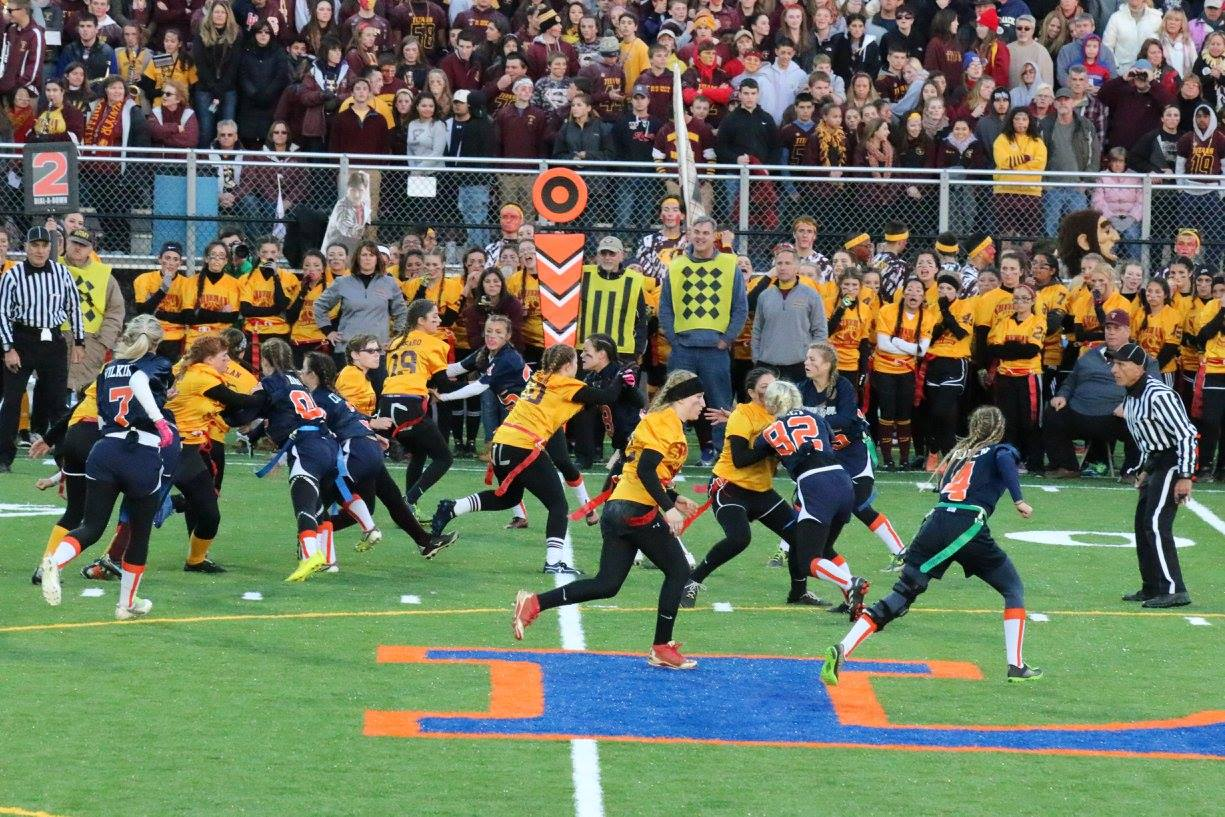
Lyman Hall and Sheehan High School compete in Annual Samaha Bowl 2015

=== Samaha Bowl ===
The first powderpuff football game of the modern era was held in 1972, in Wallingford, Connecticut. Judy Samaha, a physical education teacher and coach for Mark T. Sheehan High School, collaborated with Jack Bloomingdale and Sue Vitali at Lyman Hall High School, Sheehan’s rival, to incorporate more girls into athletic activities. Jack’s idea of the Powder Puff Game was born and played between the cross-town rivals.

Since then, powderpuff football has spread over the nation, from neighboring towns in Connecticut to schools in California, Texas, and Florida. The annual Samaha Bowl game still takes place the Wednesday before Thanksgiving and is the longest running powderpuff game in the country.

The tradition was adopted in Massachusetts at schools such as Pope John XXIII High School where underclass girls faced upperclass girls. The tradition still lives with schools like Mystic Valley Regional Charter School playing once a year, the day before Thanksgiving Day, or St. David's School in Raleigh, North Carolina, which attracts a stadium full of spectators for a high-energy game under the lights.

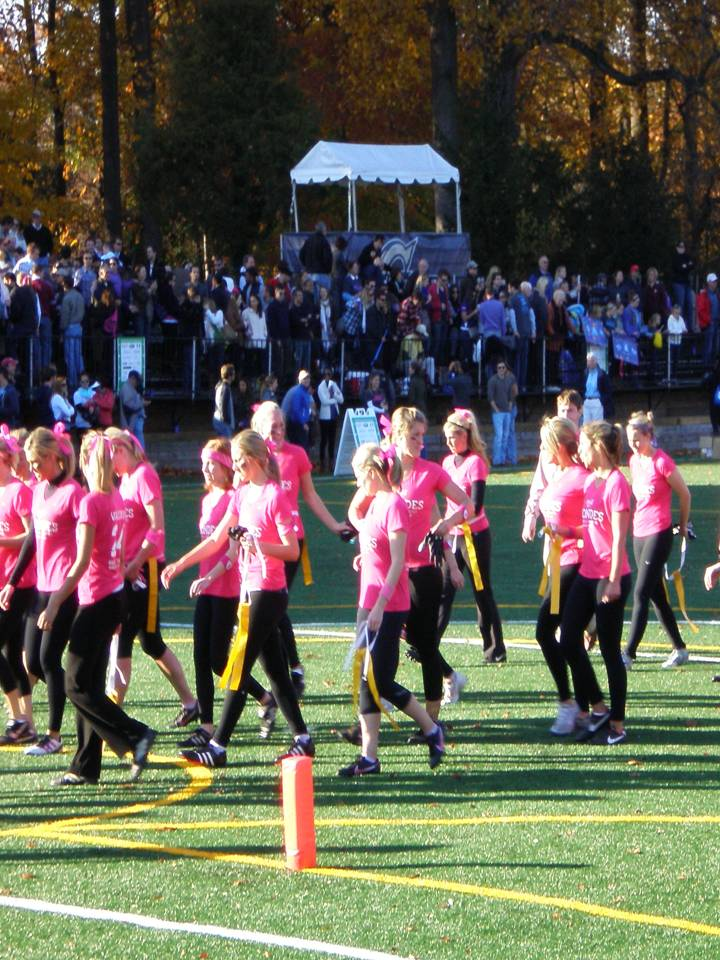
Team Blonde at the 2011 Blondes vs. Brunettes powder puff football game in Washington, D.C.

Many schools that participate in powderpuff games have created their own traditions. Examples of traditions are the creation of team uniform T-shirts for each of the teams, pre-game pep talks, and special half-time performances from the male members, sometimes with them dressing up as cheerleaders.

== Blondes vs. brunettes charity football ==
Blondes vs. Brunettes is a powderpuff football game played in cities across the United States. Proceeds from the event are donated to the Alzheimer's Association. The annual contests were started by Sara Allen Abbott, whose father, Texas State Representative Joseph Hugh Allen, died of Alzheimer's disease in 2008. Looking for a way to raise funds for the Alzheimer's Association, Abbott organized a powderpuff football game between blonde and brunette teams, in tribute to her father, a lifelong football fan.

In the fall of 2005, the first blonde vs. brunette powderpuff football game was played at Hains Point in Washington, D.C., and raised $10,000. Subsequently, the game searched for a more suitable home and moved around the Washington, D.C., area before settling down at George Washington University’s Mount Vernon Athletic Field in 2009. The Washington D.C game received considerable publicity including a feature article in The Washington Post. As the event spread to different cities, local media outlets used alliterative, attention grabbing headlines such as, "Blondes and brunettes battle it out to fund Alzheimer's research" and "Blondes Battle Brunettes at the Cotton Bowl".

Abbott planned to continue the expansion to more cities and eventually establish a "Blondes vs. Brunettes Super Bowl." In 2014, Blondes vs. Brunettes Charity Football was re-branded to "RivALZ", allowing teams to form on rivalries other than hair color.

== Controversy ==
=== Gender roles ===
Powderpuff games have faced backlash for enforcing gender stereotypes. Teachers and parents alike have criticized the games for "demeaning women's athletic ability", citing how the name implies that girls are fragile and only fit to play flag football. There is also the argument that girls should feel like they are able to play football whenever they want, and not have to have a special spectacle just for female students to participate in a male-dominated sport is a mockery of the abilities of female athletes.

=== Violence ===
Powderpuff games have also come under fire for encouraging violence between peers, especially at some schools where junior girls are subject to hazing by the senior class. In 2003, two Chicago area high-schools participated in hazing that led to five girls being hospitalized. School officials noted that the game was not an officially sanctioned event as the school did not promote, plan, or even know about the event.

== See also ==
- Powder Puff Derby airplane race
- Sadie Hawkins dance, an annual high school dance to which the girls invite the boys
- Utah Girls Tackle Football League, an all-girls youth American football league
