= Samantha Kleinberg =

American computer scientist

Samantha Kleinberg is an American computer scientist known for her work in causality, artificial intelligence applications in healthcare, and health informatics. She is a professor of computer science at Stevens Institute of Technology in Hoboken, New Jersey and current Farber Chair Professor.

== Education ==
Kleinberg earned a bachelor's, master's, and PhD from NYU in 2006, 2008, and 2010 respectively. She did a post-doc at Columbia from 2010 to 2012.

== Career ==
In 2012, she became a faculty member at Stevens with promotions in 2018 to associate professor and 2024 to full professor. In 2023, she also was appointed to the position of Farber Chair Professor named after David J. Farber.

Kleinberg has written two books in causality and was the editor of a third. A text book titled Causality, Probability, and Time in 2012, a general audience book Why: A Guide to Finding and Using Causes in 2015, and editor to Time and Causality across the Sciences. in 2019.

== Honors and community service ==
Kleinberg is a National Science Foundation CAREER Award recipient, a James S. McDonnell Foundation Scholar, and a Kavli Fellow with the National Academy of Sciences. She serves on the editorial boards for Obersvational Studies and the European Journal for Philosophy of Science. She has served on program committees for Conference for Health, Inference and Learning, Machine Learning for Healthcare, AAAI, IEEE, ACM, AMIA, and Grace Hopper Celebration.
