= Ken Diego =

American television director and producer

Ken Diego is an American television director and producer.

== Positions held ==
- Director on Sesame Street Presents: The Street We Live On (2004), Elmo Visits the Doctor (2005), Elmo's World: Reach for the Sky (2006), Guess That Shape and Colour (2006) and Sesame Street (2005 - 2013)
- Associate Director on Sesame Street (2005 - 2013), The Tony Awards (2011-2013), Live from Lincoln Center: Carousel (2013)
- Producer on Guess That Shape and Colour
- Assistant Director on Our Town (2003)

== Awards and nominations ==
Diego has been nominated for twelve Daytime Emmy awards, in the category Outstanding Directing in a Children's Series, for his work on Sesame Street. He was nominated from 2002 to 2013, and won nine times in 2002, 2004, 2005, 2007, 2009 - 2013. His first DE win was shared with Emily Squires, Ted May, Steve Feldman, Victor DiNapoli, Jim Martin, and Lisa Simon, and tied with Mitchell Kriegman and Dean Gordon on The Book of Pooh.

Diego has also been nominated for four Directors Guild of America awards, in the category Outstanding Directorial Achievement in Musical Variety, for his work on Great Performances: Dances in America, and the 61st, 65th and 66th Tony Awards. He was nominated in 2003, 2008, 2012 and 2013 and won all four awards. His first DGA win was shared with Matthew Diamond, Rae Kraus, and Henry Z. Neimark.
