= Samantha Punch =

British professor and Scottish bridge player

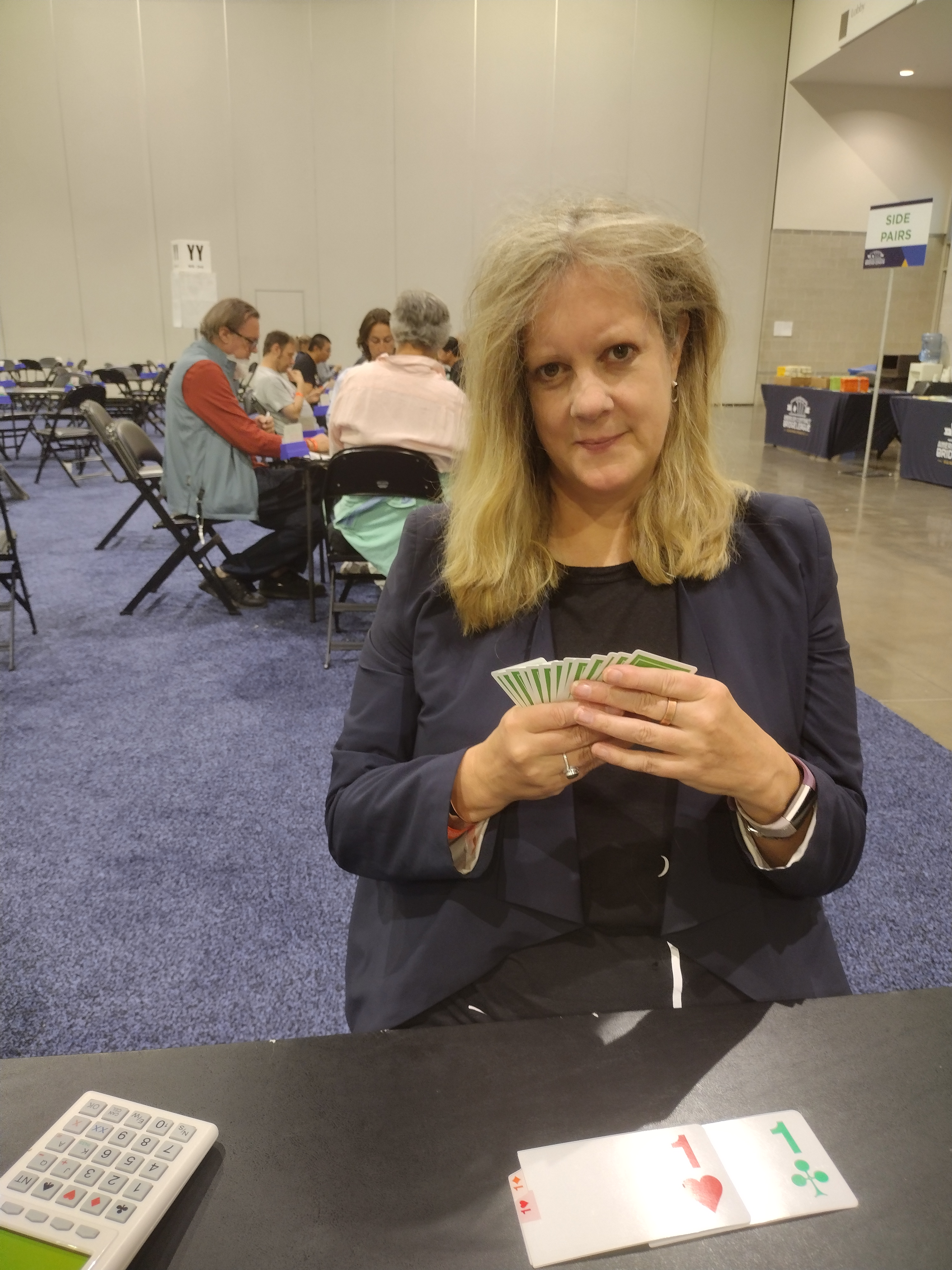
- Samantha Punch
- Born: Samantha Punch

Samantha Punch is a professor at Stirling University and a Scottish champion bridge player.

== Career ==
Dr. Punch is a Professor of Sociology, Social Policy & Criminology at Stirling University.

Samantha has an H-index of 37.

== Bridge accomplishments ==
Samantha grew up in England but moved to Scotland. She has represented Scotland on over twenty occasions. Her highest finish is fourth on the Scottish Women's Team at the World Championships in Wroclaw in 2016.

== Bridge: A MindSport for All (BAMSA) ==
Dr. Punch started BAMSA in 2013. BAMSA established a new academic discipline, the sociology of bridge. BAMSA has three key goals:

1. transform the image of bridge,
2. encourage more people of all ages to play,
3. to ensure the card game continues to thrive.

== Personal life ==
Samantha lives in Scotland with her partner-in-life and bridge partner, Stephen Peterkin.

== Bibliography ==
=== Books ===
Get Set for Sociology, McIntosh, I. and Punch, S.

Global Perspectives on Rural Childhood and Youth: Young Rural Lives, Panelli, R., Punch, S. and Robson, E.

Children's Food Practices in Families and Institutions, Punch, S., McIntosh, I. and Emond, R.

Sociology: Making Sense of Society, Fifth edition, Punch, S., Marsh, I., Keating, M. and Harden, J.

Children and Young People’s Relationships: Learning Across Majority and Minority Worlds, Punch, S. and Tisdall, K.

Families, Intergenerationality, and Peer Group Relations, Punch, S. and Vanderbeck, R.

Bridge at the Top: Behind the Screens
