= Anthea Larken =

Commandant Anthea Larken CBE
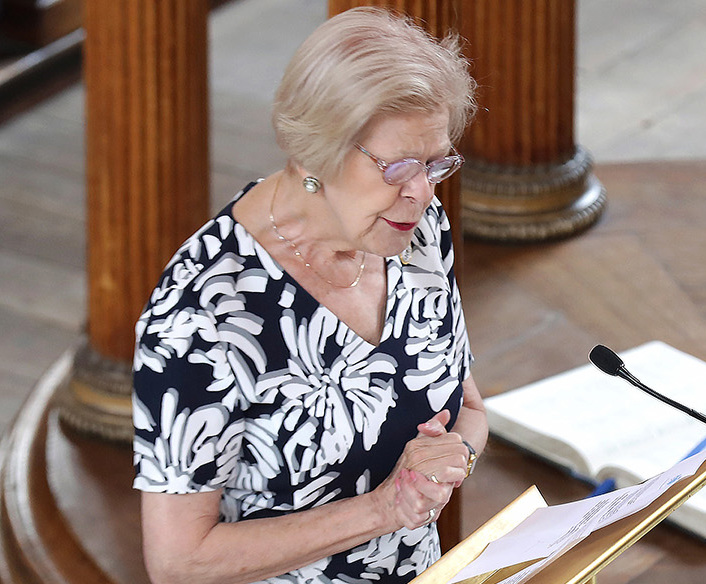
- Larken during the 100th anniversary celebration of the WRNS, 2017
- Born: 1938 (age 87–88)
- Military career
- Allegiance: United Kingdom
- Branch: Women's Royal Naval Service
- Service years: 1956–1996
- Rank: Commandant
- Other work: President of Not Forgotten Association; Vice-President of Association of Wrens

Commandant Anthea Larken CBE (born 1938) served as Director of the Women's Royal Naval Service (WRNS) between 1988 and 1991, while also acting as aide-de-camp to Queen Elizabeth II. Larken has since served as president of the Not Forgotten Association and the Association of Wrens. President, TS Dreadnought, Greenwich SCC

== Naval career ==
Anthea Larken was born in 1938, and joined the Women's Royal Naval Service (WRNS) in 1956. Her initial role was as a range assessor, and became a photographic interpreter five years later. After a further four years, she was posted as a staff officer to the Singapore Naval Base in 1964. In 1967, Larken became a secretarial officer, and in 1976 became the officer in charge of the WRNS officer training programme at the Britannia Royal Naval College in Dartmouth, Devon.

In 1981, she joined the Military Agency for Standardisation in NATO, and in 1985 became the chief services officer to the flag officer at HMNB Devonport. Larken joined the Royal College of Defence Studies in 1987, before becoming the Director of the WRNS between 1988-1991. At the same time, she also held the position of aide-de-camp to Queen Elizabeth II.

Larken was an advocate of the opinion that WRNS should be able to go to sea on Royal Navy warships, ever since she visited the United States Navy and Royal Canadian Navy in the late 1970s. While Larken was Director of the WRNS, in 1990 women went to sea for the first time on HMS Brilliant. In 1992, she was promoted to Commandant. At the end of her service as Director, Larken was named to the Order of the British Empire as a Commander. The WRNS were merged into the Royal Navy in November 1993, with Larken remaining Director and Company Secretary for the Operational Command Training Organisation, a post she held until 1996.

== In retirement ==
Larken was awarded an Honorary Doctor of Laws by the University of Greenwich in 2000. By 2012, she was president of the Not Forgotten Association. Larken later became President of the Association of Wrens.
