= Samantha Gordon =

American football and soccer player (born 2003)

Sam Gordon
- Born: Samantha Gordon; February 21, 2003 (age 23); Salt Lake City, Utah, U.S.
- Known for: American football abilities
- Awards: NFL Game Changer Award (2017)
Association football career
- Height: 5 ft 0 in (1.52 m)
- Position: Defender
Youth career
- Utah Soccer Alliance
College career
| Years | Team | Apps | (Gls) |
| 2021–2023 | Columbia Lions | 50 | (0) |

Samantha Gordon (born February 21, 2003) is an American football running back for the Salt Lake Wildcats of the Women's Football Alliance. A native of Salt Lake City, she earned fame as a youth when YouTube videos of her skills were uploaded by her father; these videos went viral and led to her making several media appearances.

== Achievements and viral popularity ==
In 2012, at the age of 9 while regularly playing against all-male teams (competing with some players who were up to twice her weight), Gordon compiled 25 touchdowns and 10 extra point conversions on 232 carries for 1,911 rushing yards in a single season, averaging 8.2 yards per carry. In addition, Gordon recorded 65 tackles for the season while playing defense. 2012 was her first year playing organized football.

On November 6, 2012, Gordon's father uploaded a highlight video to YouTube that by Thursday of that week had generated nearly 5 million views. His recording of her football prowess garnered attention from various news outlets, as well as the National Football League.

== Media and sporting appearances ==
Gordon has appeared on Good Morning America, tackled Marshall Faulk on the set of the NFL Network, huddled up with the San Francisco 49ers at practice, and gained the attention and praise of U.S. soccer stars Abby Wambach and Mia Hamm. 49ers running back LaMichael James and former NFL player, Super Bowl MVP, and Heisman Trophy winner Desmond Howard both jokingly stated that she should win the Heisman Trophy. She was featured on a Wheaties cereal box, the company stating that she was chosen because she is an inspiration to young girls. She is the first female football player to appear on a Wheaties box.

Gordon was invited to attend Super Bowl XLVII by the NFL as the guest of NFL Commissioner Roger Goodell. During the Super Bowl weekend, Gordon was a guest blogger for espnW, performed a skit during the NFL Honors award show with Alec Baldwin, attended the Commissioner's press conference and media day, and watched the game in the Commissioner's suite with high ranking political figures and well-known football personalities. Gordon was also featured in an NFL Evolution commercial that aired during the game.

Following the Super Bowl, Gordon attended the Cartoon Network Hall of Game Awards show during which she won a Game trophy for Most Viral Player.

Gordon's football story and the experiences she had following the posting of her YouTube highlight video were the inspiration for the NFL's Together We Make Football contest. Gordon was featured in an NFL commercial that kicked off the contest by asking football fans to share their football stories with the NFL.

== Book ==
With the help of her neighbor, Gordon wrote a book, Sweet Feet: Samantha Gordon's Winning Season, about her football season and the experiences she had following the season, appearing on Conan and Fox and Friends to promote the book.

== Utah Girls Football League ==
In 2015, the first known all-girls tackle football league in America, the Utah Girls Tackle Football League, was formed; Gordon was a founding member. As of 2019, the league has 446 girls, ranging from fourth grade to twelfth grade, on 24 teams; 35% of the girls are minorities.

In June 2017, Gordon and her father joined with five other Utah Girls Tackle Football League players to sue three different school districts in the Salt Lake City area and force them to offer female American football as a varsity sport. The Title IX-based lawsuit was filed June 23.

== College soccer ==
From 2021 to 2024, Gordon attended Columbia University, where she played soccer as a defender for the Lions.

== Professional football career ==
In 2025, Gordon returned to her native Salt Lake City and signed with the Salt Lake Wildcats, then an expansion team in the Women's Football Alliance. Gordon is a two-way player for the Wildcats, playing both running back and linebacker, and was brought onto the new venture by longtime personal friend Laura Goetz, who played quarterback for the team.

== See also ==
- List of female American football players
