= Samantha Arnaudo =

Italian cyclist (born 1993)

Personal information
- Born: 22 May 1993 (age 33)

Cycling career
- Sport: Cycling
- Discipline: Road
- Role: Rider

Professional team
- 2020: Bepink

Samantha Arnaudo (born 22 May 1993) is an Italian professional racing cyclist, who most recently rode for UCI Women's Continental Team Bepink.
