= Death of Samantha Martin =

2006 child death in Canada

Samantha Martin
- Born: 1993; Alberta, Canada
- Died: December 1, 2006 (aged 13); Alberta, Canada

Samantha Martin was a Canadian girl who died of a heart attack in December 2006 at age 13. Following her death, her parents – particularly her mother Velvet Martin – fought legal restrictions on publicizing information about children in Alberta's child welfare system, alleged that Samantha's death was caused by neglect while in foster care, and lobbied for changes to an Alberta law that required disabled children to enter foster care in order to receive medical treatment.

== History ==
Samantha Martin was born in 1993 in Alberta, Canada. She was diagnosed with tetrasomy 18p, a genetic condition which causes a wide range of medical and developmental problems. Social workers advised the family that Samantha would receive better medical support for her condition if she were placed in foster care; her mother, Velvet Martin, claimed that the state forced her to do so in order to obtain funding and services for Samantha. Samantha was placed with a foster family, with whom she lived for more than ten years.

Martin died of a cardiac arrest in December 2006 at age 13, five months after returning to the care of her biological family. Under Alberta law, it is illegal to publish the name or photograph of children in the provincial welfare system, even those that have died. In order to draw attention to the circumstances leading to Martin's death, the family first sought to have the publication ban lifted in her case.

Velvet Martin lobbied for changes to Alberta law. In 2008, an amendment to the Alberta Family Support for Children with Disabilities Act was passed that, according to the St. Albert Gazette, "requires that participants in the Family Support for Children with Disabilities Program are recognized as legally distinct from children in protective services under the intervention model".

During a 2011 inquiry, biological family members alleged that neglect under foster care, including abuse, malnutrition, and untreated seizures, had contributed to Samantha's death. The claims were denied by the foster family. In 2012, Provincial Court Judge Marilena Carminati ruled that although Martin's death was attributable to natural causes, the Alberta foster care system had failed Martin, who was malnourished and had gone for extended periods without seeing a doctor. The ruling recommended several for changes to the provincial child welfare policies to prevent similar future deaths.

For her advocacy work, Velvet Martin was awarded the Edmonton Mayor's Award and a human rights award from the John Humphrey Centre for Peace and Human Rights.
