= Samantha De Reviziis =

Italian entrepreneur and fur fashion blogger

- Born: 24 May 1985 (age 39); Turin, Italy
- Occupation(s): Entrepreneur and fashion blogger
- Website: www.samanthadereviziis.com

Samantha De Reviziis is an Italian entrepreneur and fur fashion blogger who has been working in the fur sector since 2009. In 2012 De Reviziis founded SDR srl: an umbrella company for four brands which she also serves as the Managing Director for. The four brands are Welovefur.com, the only blog in the world specialized in the fur sector – consulting agency Samanthadereviziis.com, Instasamy.com a digital agency with an eCommerce focus, and finally – Sostenibilità.com, a start-up specialized in the sustainability of fur and fashion.

De Reviziis has 145k followers on Instagram and her account is verified by Instagram. As a media personality and fur entrepreneur, De Reviziis has been featured in publications such as Vogue, Elle, Marie Claire, Bazaar, Le Figaro, and Grazia.

== Career ==
After obtaining diplomas from Saga Furs and Kopenhagen Fur, De Reviziis established her first business, Quiriz srl in Turin, a start-up in the design and digital sector, in 2009.

In November 2013, De Reviziis founded Welovefur.com, the first and only blog in the world that specialises in the fur sector. The blog is independent, and its network has hundreds of thousands of users. This network includes the whole fur industry supply chain: buyers of the fur sector, brokers, all kinds of suppliers (artisans, garment makers, tanneries, button suppliers), fairs, auctions, producers for third party brands, b2b clients and B2C Today the blog is worth millions of Euros. Spring boarding from her blog, De Reviziis launched a brand designing and creating fur garments from 2015 to 2017.

In 2017, De Reviziis founded Samantha De Reviziis, a consulting agency operating in the fashion, fur and sustainability sectors. The brand combines De Reviziis’ passion for fur and fashion with her knowledge of IT, software and digital marketing strategies, and saw her collaborate with brands such as Modem Magazine.

In 2016 De Reviziis moved to Qatar and began to serve as the Social Media Editor for Grazia Qatar. The role involves creating the Digital Editorial plan and covering fashion week schedules, notably the Couture Week, Women and Men Ready-to-wear fashion weeks of New York, London, Milan, Paris, Dubai, Moscow and Shanghai. De Reviziis also holds the position of as fashion reporter for the Asian and North European fashion weeks for fur garments for the fashion magazine Elle Italia.

In 2020, De Reviziis launched Instasamy.com, a complimentary brand to her other companies, and works with key fashion industry names, such as Ermanno Scervino, Ulyana Sergeenko, MaxMara and Vivetta. Instasamy is a Digital Agency with an annexed e-commerce arm that deals with Instagram, Telegram, TikTok and YouTube but also offers online marketing, PR, data analysis, producing music and digital content. Through her consulting agency Samantha offers specialised consulting on fur and sustainability in the fashion and fur sector.

== Recognition and awards ==
In November 2012, De Reviziis was awarded best designer by the IFF at the IHT International Herald Tribune's Luxury Business Conference.

In 2014, Russian magazine, 3a feature about De Reviziis and her career in the fur sector.

In 2016, De Reviziis’ Welovefur blog was studied at MBA as case history which coincided with her move to Qatar and the growth of her personal brand in the region, where she is considered to be an ‘It Girl’ as well as an entrepreneur.

In 2016, the oldest furrier in America, Richard Swartz, dedicated a book to the fur sector, entitled "To Fur With Love", which featured Samantha De Reviziis on the cover and included a chapter dedicated to her work in the fur industry.

In 2019 Vogue Italia selected De Reviziis as a judge for their Remix Contest, as Expert Of Fur Sustainability alongside Vogue Italia's deputy director and head of Vogue Talents Sara Sozzani Maino; Italian designer Gabriele Colangelo; and Filipino fashion influencer Bryanboy.

== Personal life ==
De Reviziis was born in Turin, Italy on 24 May 1985.

De Reviziis is in a relationship with Italian fashion photographer, Matteo Volta. The couple currently reside in Milan, although they regularly travel to China, America, and across Europe to promote their business ventures.
