= Samantha Casella =

Italian director and screenwriter

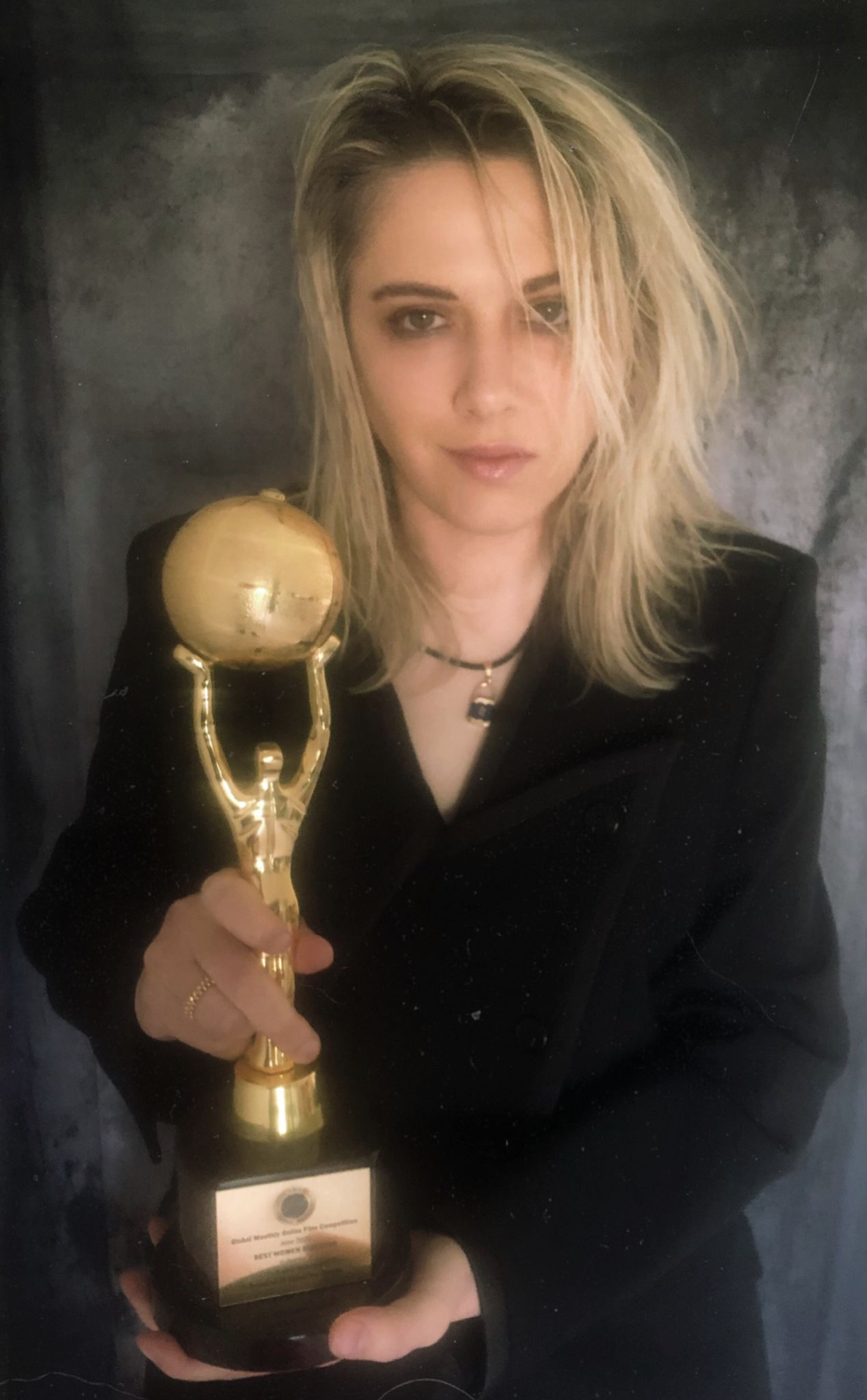
- Samantha Casella at the Global Film Competition 2022
- Born: October 1, 1981 (age 44); Faenza, Italy
- Occupations: Actress; Director, Screenwriter
- Years active: 2001–present

Samantha Casella is an Italian director, actress and screenwriter born on October 1, 1981, in Faenza, Italy.

Samantha Casella is a film director who investigates the dark side which resides in the hearts and minds of her characters. Her style leads to a journey through the unconscious, where the atmospheres recall a pictorial universe full of mystery and darkness.

== Biography ==
Samantha Casella studied screenwriting and narrative techniques at the Holden School in Turin and cinema directing at the Scuola Immagina in Florence.

Her director essay, the short film “Juliette” has participated in various festivals, winning 19 awards, including two awards at the “Massimo Troisi European Award".

She continued her path by directing some short films including "Silenzi Interrotti", "Iris" with Elisabetta Rocchetti and "Ágape" with Marina Rocco and Paolo Stella; which have won at international festivals.

Later she directed "Giro di giostra", a medium-length film presented during the Mostra Internazionale d’arte Cinematografica in Venice, the Venice Film Meeting section.

In the documentary sector her most important works are: "Mediterraneo", centered on the sculptor Giuseppe Spagnulo and presented at the Venice Biennale; "The West according to Civitelli", on the cartoonist of Tex Willer; "Via Crucis al Pantheon" which proposes the manufacturing processes of the Via Crucis installed at the Pantheon in Rome and "Self-portrait with Pope", testimony of a painting by Gianni Bubani and a poem by Davide Rondoni donated to Pope Benedict XVI.

In 2019 she directed "I Am Banksy" with Marco Iannitello. At its debut in the TCL Chinese Theater in Los Angeles at the Golden State Film Festival, it won Best International Short. It also won Best Foreign Short at the Los Angeles Independent Film Festival Award and Best International Short at the Los Angeles Theatrical Release Competition & Award. In total, the short film collected 15 awards, including Best Director at the Accolade Global Film Competition.

In 2020 she directed the short film "To A God Unknown", distributed in the United States by FourWalled and it won 228 awards at international festivals organized in 35 different countries, including the Independent Short Award, the Metropolitan Film Festival NYC, the Toronto Short Film Channel Festival, the International Motion Picture Critics Awards, the Royal Society of Motion Picture Award, the Hollywood Gold Awards, the Star Hollywood Awards and the Global Film Competition.

In 2022 she made her first feature film: Santa guerra – Holy War starring Eugenia Costantini. In the cast, in addition to Samantha Casella, Ekaterina Buscemi, Emma Quartullo and Maria Grazia Cucinotta also star in the film.

Santa Guerra – Holy War premiered on 7 September 2022 in a special event during the 79th Venice International Film Festival. In that event, Santa Guerra – Holy War won two special awards: the Tangoo Award for Cinema and the Italian Film Festival Award.

Until April 2023 Santa Guerra – Holy War won over 300 awards including 110 for Best Film and 65 for Best Director.

In Santa Guerra – Holy War, Samantha Casella plays the ghost that haunts the protagonist. For this role she was presented with 36 awards for best supporting actress.

In 2022 she is the director and main actress of the short film "The Antithesis of Love" produced by Il Cenacolo delle Arti by Lamberto Fabbri.

In 2024, she directed and starred in her second feature film, Katabasis. Katabasis premiered on 2 September 2024 in a collateral event of the 81 Venice Film Festival. In that event she was awarded the Starlight Award for Innovative Direction. Between September 2024 and February 2025, Katabasis received over 200 awards at International Film Festivals.

In 2025, she created a video artwork for the publication of William Blake’s *Songs of Innocence and of Experience*, translated by Giuseppe Conte and featuring plates by Domenico Paladino, published by Il Cenacolo delle Arti di Lamberto Fabbri.

During the 79th edition of the Cannes Film Festival, the 17 May 2026 print issue of Variety magazine announced the third film directed by and starring Samantha Casella: La Tenerezza del Serpente, presented to international audiences under the title *The Serpent’s Caress*. The film concludes the *Trilogy of the Subconscious*. Alongside Casella in the leading role, the cast includes Bruno Bilotta and Laura Trotter, returning to cinema after an absence of around thirty years.

== Filmography ==
=== Short films ===
- Juliette (2001)
- Frozen (2002)
- Non chiudere gli occhi (2002)
- Memorie da un’isola di morti (2003)
- Silenzi Interrotti (2004)
- Iris (2005)
- L’opportunità (2008)
- Dies Irae (2009)
- Ágape (2010)
- I Am Banksy (2019)
- To a God Unknown – Al Dio sconosciuto (2020)
- The Antithesis of Love (2022)

=== Medium-length films ===
- Giro di giostra (2006)

=== Full-length films ===
- Santa guerra – Holy War (2022)
- Katabasis (2024)

=== Documentaries ===
- Mediterraneo (2001)
- Saison Russe (2003)
- Il West secondo Civitelli (2007)
- Incontri Jazz (2008)
- Dai secoli del fuoco e del disegno (2009)
- Solida Imago (2010)
- Diario per Immagini (2010)
- In Illo Tempore (2011)
- Coincidentia Oppositorum (2011)
- Via Crucis al Pantheon (2012)
- Autoritratto con Papa (2012)
- TraDizioni (2013)
- Passione, Meditazione sul Cristo (2014)

=== Videoclips ===
- Boy Down di Strippop (2008)
- Nero Deserto di Santo Barbaro (2009)

=== Video Art ===
- Ascesi (2015)
- Songs of innocence and experience (2025)

=== Actress ===
- To a God Unknown – Al Dio sconosciuto, directed by Samantha Casella (2020)
- The Antithesis of Love, directed by Samantha Casella (2022)
- Santa Guerra, directed by Samantha Casella (2022)
- Katabasis, directed by Samantha Casella (2024)
