= Samantha Thornhill =

American poet

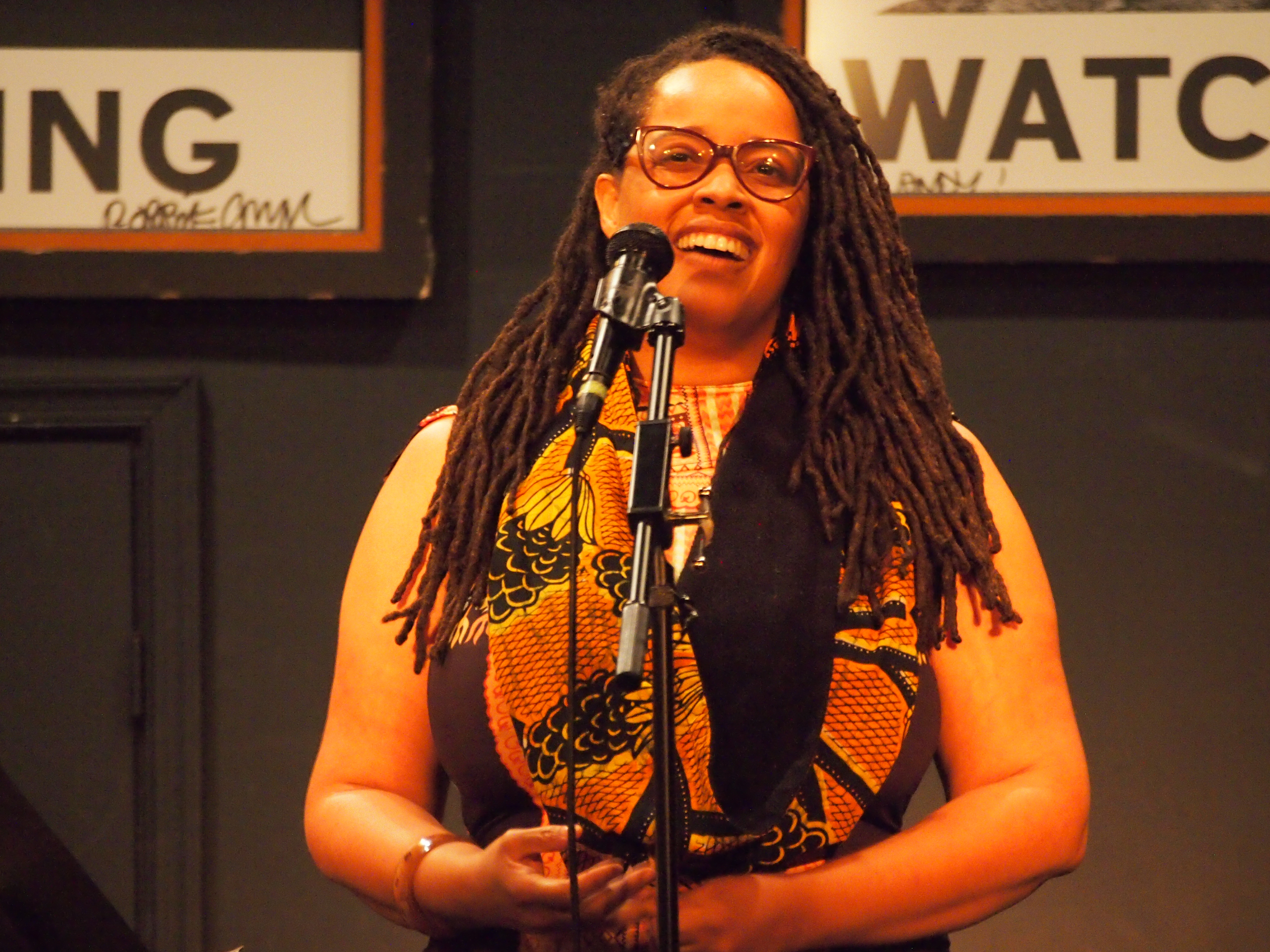
- Thornhill in 2017
- Born: Samantha Felisha Thornhill
- Education: Florida State University, University of Virginia
- Occupations: poet, author, educator and producer
- Notable work: see Works
- Website: samanthaspeaks.com

Samantha Felisha Thornhill is a poet, author, educator and producer from the island nation of Trinidad and Tobago.

== Biography ==
Thornhill's interest in poetry began in 6th grade when she wrote a poem about Christmas in Trinidad. This established a connection with her Trinidadian roots. She attended Wellington High School in West Palm Beach, Florida, where she was assisted by her 10th-grade English teacher to develop her writing skills. Thornhill later began to contribute to the school's literary magazine, Poetry Justice. By her senior year, she became the editor-in-chief of the magazine.

She attended Florida State University in Tallahassee (2002), where she majored in English with a concentration in Creative Writing, and a minor in Black Studies. This was during a period when the English Department had its highest concentration of black professors, which contributed to her growing knowledge and also led to her meeting some other black poets such as Gwendolyn Brooks and Rita Dove. While in college, Thornhill became interested in the spoken word. While performing at FSU, she caught the attention of Keith Rogers, the leader of the local Black Talk poetry troupe. Rogers invited her to perform at the Black on Black poetry reading event, where he was impressed by her writing. Thornhill was invited to become a member of Black Talk, launching her career in the spoken word.

After graduating with an MFA degree in poetry from the University of Virginia (2004), she moved to New York City, where she has taught poetry to actors at the Juilliard School.

== Works ==
=== Books ===
- Chapter Book: Everybody Hates School Presentations, Simon & Schuster, 2007
- Picture Book: Odetta, Queen of Folk, Scholastic Books, 2010
- Poetry: Watch Me Swing, Red Beard Press, 2011

=== Articles and reviews ===
- Meridian, Spring 2005: "Kyle Dargan’s The Listening" (review)
- Black Issues Book Review, March–April 2005: "In the Key of Life" (review)
- Black Issues Book Review, March–April 2005: "Star Poets and Poet Stars: The Rise of the Celebrity Bard" (article)
- Black Issues Book Review, March–April 2005: "A Soulful Place for Poetry" (article)
- Black Issues Book Review, March–April 2006 "Tupac Shakur" (article)
- The Juilliard Journal, Vol. XXIV No. 1, Sept 2008: "An Affair to Remember" (article)

== Awards and fellowships ==
- Cody Harris Poetry Award, Florida State University, 2002
- Mart P. Hill Honors Thesis Award, Florida State University, 2002
- Henry Hoyns Writing Fellowship, University of Virginia, 2002–2003
- Cave Canem Fellowship, 2006, 2004, 2003
- Archie D. & Berth H Walker Scholarship, Fine Arts Work Center in Provincetown, MA, 2003
- Soul Mountain Writing Fellowship, 2004
- Hedgebrook Retreat for Women Writers Residency, 2008
- Jerome Foundation Travel Grant, 2008
- Squaw Valley Community of Writers Scholarship, 2009
- University of Missouri Grant for Summer Seminar in Greece, 2011
- Funds for Teachers Travel Grant, Cuba, 2012
- Brooklyn Arts Council Grant, 2014
