= Samantha Ettus =

American writer

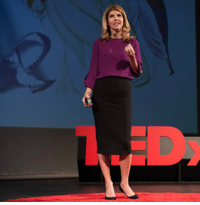
- Born: July 12, 1972 (age 54); New York City, U.S.
- Education: Harvard University (BA, MBA)
- Occupations: Bestselling author, television personality, activist, motivational speaker
- Spouse: Mitchell Jacobs (m. 2005)
- Website: SamanthaEttus.com

Samantha Ettus (born July 12, 1972) is an American bestselling author, speaker, TV contributor, activist, and podcast host.

== Early life ==
Ettus was born and raised in New York City, and graduated from the Dalton School. She earned an undergraduate degree in anthropology from Harvard University and a master's in business administration from Harvard Business School.

== Business ==
Ettus started her first business, a personal branding firm, following her graduation at Harvard Business School in 2001. She was named to Entrepreneur Magazine's list of 100 Powerful Women of 2021. Ettus sat on the advisory board of the Forbes School of Business and Technology, Sparks and Honey, and Inspiro Tequila.

== Media ==
Ettus has hosted 75 episodes of Obsessed TV, an online talk show she co-created with Gary Vaynerchuk in which she interviewed celebrities and athletes including Bethenny Frankel and Al Roker. She has appeared on television shows including The Today Show, NBC News, Access Hollywood, CNN, Dr. Phil and The Doctors. Previously, Ettus wrote a syndicated weekly column called "Celebrity Assets" for Scripps Howard. She was the first person quoted in Sheryl Sandberg's bestselling book, Lean In.

Ettus has authored five books: The Experts' Guide to 100 Things Everyone Should Know How to Do, The Experts' Guide to Life at Home, The Experts' Guide to Doing Things Faster, The Experts' Guide to the Baby Years, and The Pie Life.

Ettus' fifth book, The Pie Life: A Guilt-Free Recipe for Success and Satisfaction, was published in September 2016. The Pie Life debuted on Good Morning America and The TODAY Show during the week of its publication.

For four years she hosted a weekly nationally syndicated call-in radio show, and was a contributor to Forbes. She has given keynote speeches at conferences, corporations, and universities, including two TEDx talks.

In the fall of 2020, Ettus launched What's Her Story With Sam & Amy, a women in business podcast for iHeartRadio, which she co-hosts with entrepreneur Amy Nelson.

== Personal life ==
Ettus is a former nationally ranked junior tennis player. She competed on the women's tennis team while attending Harvard.

In 2005, Ettus married Mitch Jacobs at Pan's Garden in Palm Beach, Florida. They have three children.
