= Samantha Rapoport =

American football player

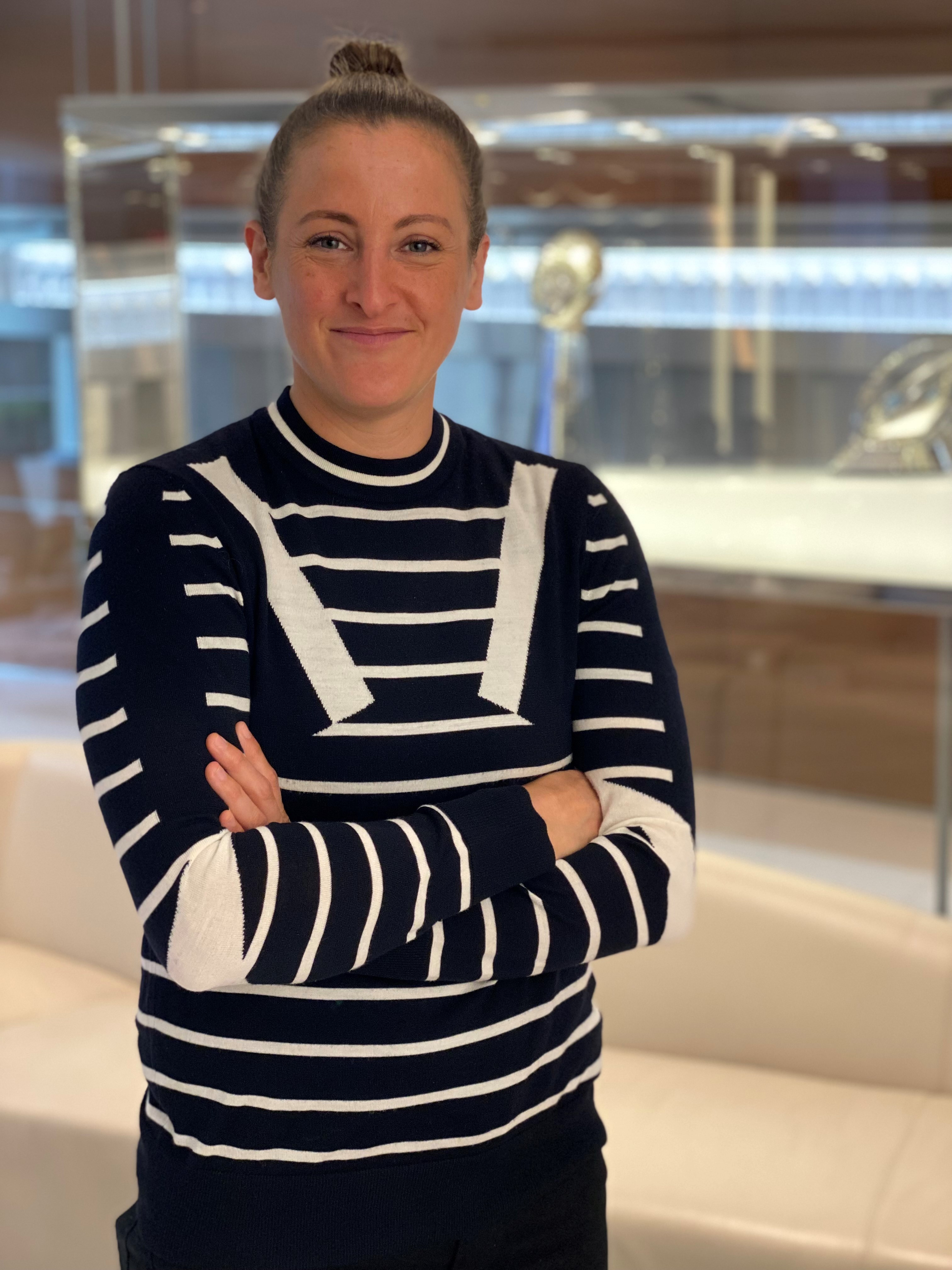

Samantha Rapoport is a sports executive specializing in American football.

== Early life ==
Rapoport grew up in Ottawa and played touch football as a child. At university, she was captain and quarterback of the Montreal Blitz football team.

== Career ==
Rapoport started her career as an intern with the National Football League in 2003, gaining the role by mailing her resume and a football along with a note that said, "What other quarterback could accurately deliver a football 386 miles?".

She held various roles at the NFL, ultimately filling the role of the NFL's Senior Director of football development in December 2017, before leaving the NFL to form a consulting firm in April 2025.

She hosted the NFL's podcast, 'Earnin' It: The NFL's Forward Progress', which published 6 episodes, with its most recent episode recorded in 2022.

Rapoport has been recognized as one of Sports Illustrated's Most Powerful Women in Sports.
