= Samantha Martin =

Canadian singer and songwriter

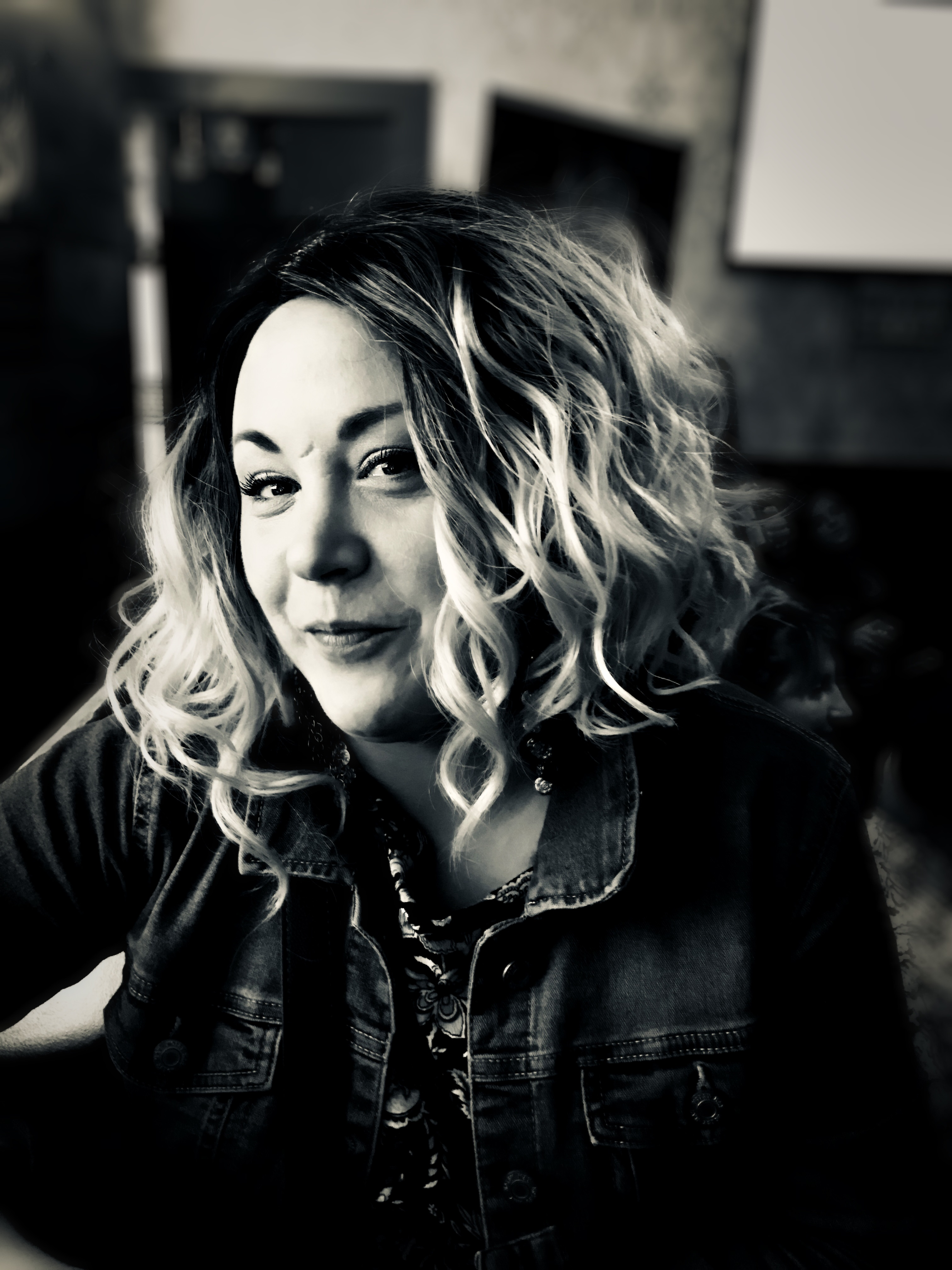
- Samantha Martin in 2018 (photo by Renan Yildizdogan)

Background information
- Born: Samantha Debra Martin; May 27, 1983 (age 42); Edmonton, Alberta
- Origin: Toronto, Canada
- Genres: Soul, R&B, blues, roots rock, gospel
- Occupations: Singer, songwriter, guitarist
- Years active: 2008–present
- Label: Gypsy Soul Records
- Website: samanthamartinmusic.com

Samantha Martin (born May 27, 1983) is a Canadian singer and songwriter whose styles mix roots rock, blues, soul and gospel music with vocals.

== Career ==
Martin has released five full-length albums, one as a solo act, one with Samantha Martin and The Haggard, and three with Samantha Martin & Delta Sugar. Following her debut record Back Home in 2008, she released the self-titled Samantha Martin and The Haggard in 2012.

In 2014, Martin formed an 11-piece blues/soul band, Samantha Martin & Delta Sugar. The band's name is a reference to southern blues traditions. Their debut record Send the Nightingale was released in 2015. According to Martin, the songs on Send the Nightingale were influenced by her mother's terminal illness at the time she was recording the album.

In 2015, Martin and the band were nominated for four Maple Blues Awards: Best Female Vocalist, Best Songwriter, Best New Group, and Best New Album/Producer. In 2018, Samantha Martin & Delta Sugar signed a record deal with Gypsy Soul Records based out of Toronto. Their record Run to Me was released on April 28, 2018 and was nominated for a Juno Award for Blues Album of the Year.

As of 2020, Samantha Martin has been nominated for thirteen Maple Blues Awards.

In 2020, Samantha Martin and her band released their new album The Reckless One. The album was nominated for a Juno Award for Blues Album of the Year. Samantha Martin and her band garnered nominations for multiple Maple Blues Awards, along with a nod for the International Artist of the Year Award at the UK Blues Awards.

== Discography ==
Albums

Title	Year	Artist	Label	Producer
Back Home	2008	Samantha Martin	Independent	Derek Downham
Samantha Martin & the Haggard	2012	Samantha Martin & the Haggard	Samantha Martin Music	John Dinsmore
Mississippi Sun	2014	Samantha Martin	Dollartone	Samantha Martin
Send the Nightingale	2015	Samantha Martin & Delta Sugar	Samantha Martin Music	Rench
Run to Me	2018	Samantha Martin & Delta Sugar	Gypsy Soul Records	Darcy Yates
The Reckless One	2020	Samantha Martin & Delta Sugar	Gypsy Soul Records	Renan Yildizdogan & Darcy Yates
