= Sami (name) =

Sami, also Sammy or Samy, is a given name and surname of different origins and meanings, most prevalent in the Arab world and Scandinavia.

== Arabic ==
Sami, Samy, Samee (Arabic: سامي sāmī) [ˈsæːmi, ˈsaː-, ˈsɛː-], is an Arabic male given name meaning "elevated (رَفْعَة raf‘ah)" or "sublime (سُمُوّ sumū/ sumuw)", in fact stemmed from the verb samā (سما) which means "to transcend", where the verb forms the adjective Sami which means "to be high, elevated, eminent, prominent".

The female given name, Samiya or Samia (سامِيَة), is formed and stemmed from this name.

"Sami" in the name Samiullah is not the same as this; rather, it is one of the 99 names of god ( ٱلسَّمِيعُ, as-Samī‘; 'all hearing'). Samir is also a different name.

== Other ==
Sami (Finnish: [ˈsɑmi]) is a Finnish male name derived from the name Samuel.

Sami is used as an alternative spelling of the nickname Sammy, abbreviated from Samantha or Samuel.

== Given name ==
- Sami (poet) (1743–1850), Sindhi poet
- Sami Abbod, Yemeni footballer
- Sami Abdulghani (born 1989), Saudi footballer
- Sami Abdullah (born 1987), Sudanese footballer
- Sami Al-Abdullah (born 1967), Qatari sprinter
- Sami Abduqahhor (1922–1990), Uzbek author and screenwriter
- Sami Agha (born 1989), Afghan cricketer
- Sami Saeed Al Ahmed (1930–2006), Iraqi historian
- Sami Aittokallio (born 1992), Finnish ice hockey player
- Sami Aldeeb (born 1949), Swiss Palestinian lawyer
- Sami Allagui (born 1986), German-born Tunisian footballer
- Sami Abdul Aziz Salim Allaithy (born 1956), Egyptian Guantanamo detainee
- Sami Ben Amar (born 1998), French-Moroccan footballer
- Sami El Anabi (born 2000), Belgian-born Moroccan footballer
- Sami Hafez Anan (born 1948), Egyptian military officer
- Sami Angawi, Saudi architect
- Sami Anttila (born 1995), Finnish ice hockey player
- Sami Al-Arian (born 1958), Kuwaiti-born political activist of Palestinian origin
- Sami al-Askari, Iraqi politician
- Sami Aslam (born 1995), Pakistani cricketer
- Sami Al-Baker (born 1971), Saudi fencer
- Sami Bashir (born 1989), Saudi footballer
- Sami Bayraktar (born 1978), Turkish-Belgian futsal player
- Sami Beigi (born 1982), Iranian singer and songwriter
- Sami Habib Beldi (born 1998), Algerian footballer
- Sami Belgroun (born 1975), Algerian judoka
- Sami Belkorchia (born 1995), French footballer
- Sami Blomqvist (born 1990), Finnish ice hockey player
- Sami Bouajila (born 1966), French actor
- Sami Bouhoudane (born 2008), Dutch footballer
- Sami Callihan (born 1987), American professional wrestler
- Sami Chamoun (born 1975), Australian rugby league footballer
- Sami Shalom Chetrit (born 1960), Israeli poet and activist
- Sami Venkatachalam Chetty (died 1958), Indian politician, businessman, and independence activist
- Sami Chouchi (born 1993), Belgian judoka
- Sami El Choum (born 1982), Lebanese footballer
- Sami Clark (1948–2022), Lebanese singer
- Sami Daher (born 1968), Lebanese actor and voice actor
- Sami Damian (1930–2012), Romanian-born Jewish literary critic and essayist
- Sami David David (born 1950), Mexican politician
- Sami Jasem Al-Dosari (born 1965), Saudi footballer
- Sami Droubi (1921–1976), Syrian politician and diplomat
- Sami Efendi (1858–1912), Ottoman calligrapher
- Sami Elopuro (born 1964), Finnish squash player
- Sami Essid (born 1968), Tunisian terrorist
- Sami Farag (1935–2015), Egyptian lawyer and judge
- Sami Faridi (born 1983), Saudi cricketer
- Sami Pasha al-Farouqi (1861–1911), Ottoman statesman
- Sami Fatha (born 1989), Saudi footballer
- Sami Al-Fayez (1932–2012), Jordanian senator and Arabian tribal figure
- Sami Fehri (born 1971), Tunisian entrepreneur, producer, and director
- Sami Feller (born 2000), American soccer player
- Sami Frashëri (1850–1904), Albanian writer and philosopher
- Sami Frey (born 1937), French actor of Polish-Jewish descent
- Sami Gabra (1882–1979), Egyptian Egyptologist and Coptologist
- Sami Gafsi (born 1980), Tunisian football manager
- Sami Garam (born 1967), Finnish cook and writer of Hungarian descent
- Sami Gayle (born 1996), American actress
- Sami Ben Gharbia, Tunisian human rights campaigner
- Sami Gjebero, Albanian politician
- Sami Grisafe (born 1985), American singer, songwriter, musician, football player, activist, and actor
- Sami Güçlü (born 1950), Turkish politician
- Sami El Gueddari (born 1984), French wheelchair racer
- Sami Guediri (born 1997), Algerian footballer
- Sami Hadawi (1904–2004), Palestinian scholar and author
- Sami Haddad (born 1950), Lebanese politician
- Sami Ibrahim Haddad (1890–1957), Palestinian-Lebanese physician and writer
- Sami Haddadin (born 1980), German electrical engineer, computer scientist, and university professor
- Sami al-Hajj (born 1969), Sudanese journalist
- Sami Hamdi (born 1990), British journalist, political commentator, and risk‑intelligence advisor
- Sami-ul-Haq (1938–2018), Pashtun religious scholar, known as Father of the Taliban
- Sami Al-Hasani (born 1992), Omani footballer
- Sami Al-Hashash (born 1959), Kuwaiti footballer
- Sami Al-Hassawi (born 1992), Omani footballer
- Sami Hautamäki, Finnish sport shooter
- Sami Hedberg (born 1981), Finnish stand up comedian and actor
- Sami Helenius (born 1974), Finnish ice hockey player
- Sami Hill (born 1994), Canadian basketball player
- Sami Hinkka (born 1978), Finish musician
- Sami al-Hinnawi (1898–1950), Syrian politician and military officer
- Sami Hoştan (1947–2015), Turkish suspect in the Ergenekon trials
- Sami Al-Husaini (born 1989), Bahraini footballer
- Sami Omar Al-Hussayen (born 1973), Saudi purported terrorist supporter
- Sami Hyypiä (born 1973), Finnish footballer
- Sami Al-Jaber (born 1972), Saudi footballer
- Sami Jasim Muhammad al-Jaburi, Iraqi terrorist
- Sami Jalal (born 2004), Danish footballer
- Sami Jauhojärvi (born 1981), Finnish cross-country skier
- Sami Jibril (born 1989), Canadian long-distance runner
- Sami Jo (born 1947), American singer
- Sami Juaim (born 1986), Yemeni footballer
- Sami al-Jundi (1921–1995), Syrian Ba'athist politician
- Sami Kallunki (1971–1999), Finnish skier
- Sami Kapanen (born 1973), Finnish ice hockey player
- Sami Sabit Karaman (1877–1957), Turkish Army officer
- Sami Jalal Karchoud (born 2004), Danish footballer
- Sami Kassar (born 1990), Saudi footballer
- Sami Al-Khaibari (born 1989), Saudi footballer
- Sami Ahmed Khalid, Sudanese pharmacognosy professor
- Sami Khedira (born 1987), German footballer
- Sami Kehela (born 1934), Canadian contract bridge player
- Sami Kelopuro (born 1987), Finnish poker player
- Sami Kennedy-Sim (born 1988), Australian freestyle skier
- Sami Keshavarz (born 2006), Canadian soccer player
- Sami Khader (born 1972), Jordanian chess player
- Sami Khan (disambiguation), multiple people
- Sami Khayat (1943–2023), Lebanese francophone theatre comic actor, director, and writer
- Sami Khedira (born 1987), German footballer
- Sami Khelifi (born 1974), Tunisian boxer
- Sami Khiyami (born 1948), Syrian diplomat
- Sami Khoreibi (born 1980), Canadian-Palestinian businessperson
- Sami Kieksi (born 1990), Finnish producer, director, and screenwriter
- Sami Kivelä (born 1979), Finnish comic book artist
- Sami Kohen (1928–2021), Turkish journalist and columnist
- Sami Kooheji (born 1984), Bahraini sailor
- Sami Kukkohovi (born 1974), Finnish musician
- Sami Kuoppamäki (born 1971), Finnish drummer
- Sami Laakkonen (born 1974), Finnish bandy player
- Sami Lahssaini (born 1998), Belgian footballer
- Sami Lähteenmäki (born 1989), Finnish ice hockey player
- Sam Lake (real name Sami Järvi, born 1970), Finnish writer
- Sami Landri (born 1998/99), Canadian drag artist and social media personality
- Sami Al-Lanqawi (1972–1997), Kuwaiti footballer
- Sami Larabi (born 1996), French footballer
- Sami Khoshaba Latchin, Iraqi-American spy
- Sami Leinonen (born 1963), Finnish Nordic combined skier
- Sami Lepistö (born 1984), Finnish ice hockey player
- Sami Levi (born 1981), Turkish singer
- Sami Lopakka (born 1975), Finnish guitarist and author
- Sami Lukis, Australian television and radio personality
- Sami Mahdi (1940–2022), Iraqi writer and poet
- Sami Mahlio (born 1972), Finnish footballer
- Sami Azara al-Majun (1932–2023), Iraqi politician
- Sami Makarem (1931–2012), Lebanese scholar, writer, poet, and artist
- Sami Mansei, Japanese Buddhist priest and poet
- Sami Mansour (1926–??), Egyptian basketball player
- Sami Matoug (born 1999), French footballer
- Sami Mavinga (born 1993), French rugby union player
- Sami Meguetounif (born 2004), French racing driver
- Sami Mermer, Turkish-Canadian documentary filmmaker
- Sami Michael (1926–2024), Israeli author
- Sami Miettinen (born 1970), Finnish author
- Sami Mohammad (1943–2026), Kuwaiti sculptor and artist
- Sami Moubayed (born 1978), Syrian historian
- Sami Mubarak (born 1991), Omani footballer
- Sami Mustonen (born 1977), Finnish freestyle skier
- Sami Mutanen (born 1984), Finnish ice hockey player
- Sami Nair (born 1946), Algerian-born French political philosopher
- Sami Al-Najei (born 1997), Saudi footballer
- Sami Hasan Al Nash (1957–2021), Yemeni footballer
- Sami Nasr (1913–1995), Palestinian geologist and company executive
- Sami Niku (born 1996), Finnish ice hockey player
- Sami Okkonen (born 1987), Finnish football manager and player
- Sami al-Oraydi (1973–2026), Jordanian militant
- Sami Osmakac (born 1986), Kosovar-American convicted terrorist
- Sami Ouaissa (born 2004), Dutch footballer
- Sami Outalbali (born 1999), French actor
- Sami Pajari (born 2001), Finnish rally driver
- Sami Panico (born 1993), Italian rugby union player of Ethiopian descent
- Sami Pietilä (born 1975), Finnish cross-country skier
- Sami Raatikainen, Finnish guitarist
- Sami Rafi (1931–2019), Egyptian visual artist, interior designer, and filmmaker
- Sami Abdul Rahman (1933–2004), Iraqi-Kurdish politician
- Sami Rähmönen (born 1987), Finnish footballer
- Sami Rajaniemi (born 1992), Finnish ice hockey player
- Sami Rebez (born 1960), Lebanese alpine skier
- Sami Repo (born 1971), Finnish cross-country skier
- Sami Rihana (born 1941), Lebanese brigadier general
- Sami Rintala (born 1969), Finnish architect and artist
- Sami Ristilä (born 1974), Finnish footballer
- Sami Ristiniemi (born 1977), Finnish actor
- Sami Rohr (1926–2012), German-born American real estate developer and philanthropist
- Sami Ryhänen (born 1980), Finnish ice hockey player
- Sami Saari (born 1962), Finnish soul musician
- Sami Sadat (born 1985), Afghan Army general
- Sami Said (writer) (born 1979), Eritrean-born Swedish writer
- Sami D. Said (born 1964), American lieutenant general
- Sami Saif (born 1972), Danish documentary filmmaker
- Sami Salo (born 1974), Finnish ice hockey player
- Sami Sandell (born 1987), Finnish ice hockey player
- Sami Sanevuori (born 1986), Finnish footballer
- Sami A. Sanjad, Lebanese-American pediatrician
- Sami Sarjula (born 1978), Finnish actor
- Sami Sauiluma (born 1993), Australian rugby league footballer
- Sami Savio (born 1975), Finnish politician
- Sami El-Sayed (born 1940), Egyptian water polo player
- Sami Schalk, American academic
- Sami Scheetz (born 1996), American politician
- Sami Selçuk (born 1937), Turkish jurist and professor of law
- Sami Seliö (born 1975), Finnish powerboat racer
- Sami Shah, Pakistani-Australian stand-up comedian and writer
- Sami Sharaf (1929–2023), Egyptian military officer and politician
- Sami Shawa (1887–1960), Syrian violinist
- Sami Abu Shehadeh (born 1975), Palestinian Israeli politician
- Sami El-Sheshini (born 1972), Egyptian footballer
- Sami Sipola (born 2001), Finnish footballer
- Sami Sirviö (born 1970), Swedish musician and lead guitarist of the rock band Kent
- Sami Jo Small (born 1976), Canadian ice hockey player
- Sami Solanki (born 1958), Pakistani astronomers
- Sami as-Solh (1887–1968), Lebanese politician
- Sami Taha (1916–1947), Palestinian labor leader
- Sami Tajeddine (born 1982), Moroccan footballer
- Sami Tallberg (born 1976), Finnish chef and food writer
- Sami Tamimi (born 1968), Palestinian chef
- Sami Tamminen (born 1997), Finnish ice hockey player
- Sami Tamminen (sailor) (born 1971), Finnish sailor
- Sami Taoufik (born 2002), Spanish-born Moroccan racing driver
- Sami Tchak (born 1960), Togolese writer
- Sami Timimi, British psychiatrist, psychotherapist, and author
- Sami Tlemcani (born 2004), French-Moroccan footballer
- Sami Trabelsi (born 1968), Tunisian football coach and player
- Sami Turgeman (born 1964), Israeli IDF general
- Sami Uğurlu (born 1978), Turkish football manager and player
- Sami Uotila (disambiguation), multiple people
- Sami Uusitalo (born 1977), Finnish musician
- Sami Väisänen (born 1973), Finnish footballer
- Sami Välimäki (born 1998), Finnish golfer
- Sami Vänskä (born 1976), Finnish musician
- Sami Vatanen (born 1991), Finnish ice hockey player
- Sami Venäläinen (born 1981), Finnish ice hockey player
- Sami Vrioni (1876–1947), Albanian politician and diplomat
- Sami Mohamed Wafa, Qatari footballer
- Sami Wahlsten (born 1967), Finnish ice hockey player
- Sami Abu Wardeh (born 1986), Kuwaiti character comedian, writer, and actor
- Sami Wattel (born 2006), French footballer
- Sami Whitcomb (born 1988), American-Australian basketball player
- Sami Wikström (born 1967), Finnish ice hockey player
- Sami Yaffa (born 1963), Finnish bass guitarist
- Sami Yetik (1878–1945), Turkish painter
- Sami Yli-Sirniö (born 1972), Finnish guitarist
- Sami Yousafzai (born 1972), Afghan journalist
- Sami Yusuf (born 1980), British musician
- Sami Zayn (born 1984), ring name of Rami Sebei, Canadian professional wrestler of Syrian descent
- Sami Zubaida (1937–2025), Iraqi scholar of Middle Eastern political sociology, law, and culinary culture
- Sami Abu Zuhri (born 1967), Palestinian politician

== Surname ==
- A. S. A. Sami (1915–1998), Indian director and screenwriter
- Adnan Sami (born 1973), Indian musician and actor
- C. M. Shafi Sami (born 1942), Bangladeshi politician
- Jagannath Sami, Fijian labor-leader, politician, and soccer player
- Joël Sami (born 1984), French footballer
- Leocísio Sami (born 1988), Bissau-Guinean footballer
- Madeleine Sami (born 1980), New Zealand actress
- Mirza Azim Sami (1840–??), poet and historian in the Emirate of Bukhara
- Mohammad Sami (born 1981), Pakistani cricketer
- Phillip Sami (born 1997), Australian league footballer

== See also ==
- Sami (disambiguation)
- Sammie (name)
- Samee, male name
- Samir (name)
- Samira (disambiguation)
