= Miettinen =

Miettinen is a Finnish surname. Notable people with the surname include:

- Antti Miettinen (born 1980), Finnish professional ice hockey forward
- Atte Miettinen (born 1975), Finnish business executive and mountaineer
- Camilo Miettinen (born 1986), Colombian-Finnish professional ice hockey forward
- Hannes Miettinen (1893–1968), Finnish athlete
- Iikka Miettinen (born 1990), Finnish professional football coach
- Jorma K. Miettinen (1921–2017), Finnish radiochemist and academician professor
- Kaisa Miettinen (born 1965), Finnish mathematician
- Olli Miettinen (1869–1946), Finnish farmer and politician
- Pauliina Miettinen (born 1972), Finnish female football (soccer) coach and former player
- Paavo Miettinen (1919–1985), Finnish fencer
- Rauno Miettinen (born 1949), Finnish Nordic combined skier
- Sami Miettinen (born 1970), Finnish non-fiction author
- Samuli Miettinen, various people
- Taisto Miettinen (born 1965), Finnish athlete
- Tatu Miettinen (born 1979), Finnish professional ice hockey centre
- Tommi Miettinen (born 1975), Finnish professional ice hockey centre
- Tony Miettinen (born 2002), Finnish professional footballer
- Ville Miettinen (born 1975), Finnish serial entrepreneur and computer programmer
- Yrjö Miettinen (1913–1969), Finnish sports shooter
