= August 1973 =

Month of 1973

<<	August 1973					>>
Su	Mo	Tu	We	Th	Fr	Sa
			1	2	3	4
5	6	7	8	9	10	11
12	13	14	15	16	17	18
19	20	21	22	23	24	25
26	27	28	29	30	31

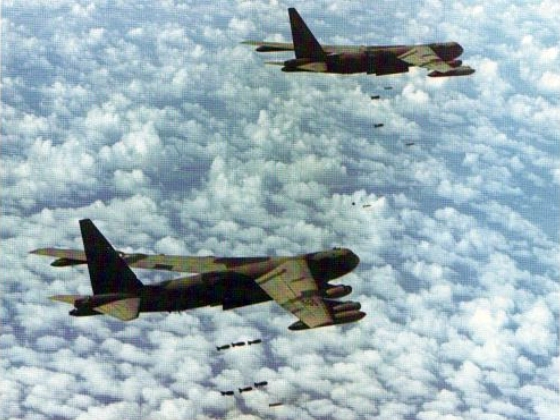
August 15, 1973: U.S. combat in Southeast Asia ends as bombing of Cambodia halts at 10:45 a.m.

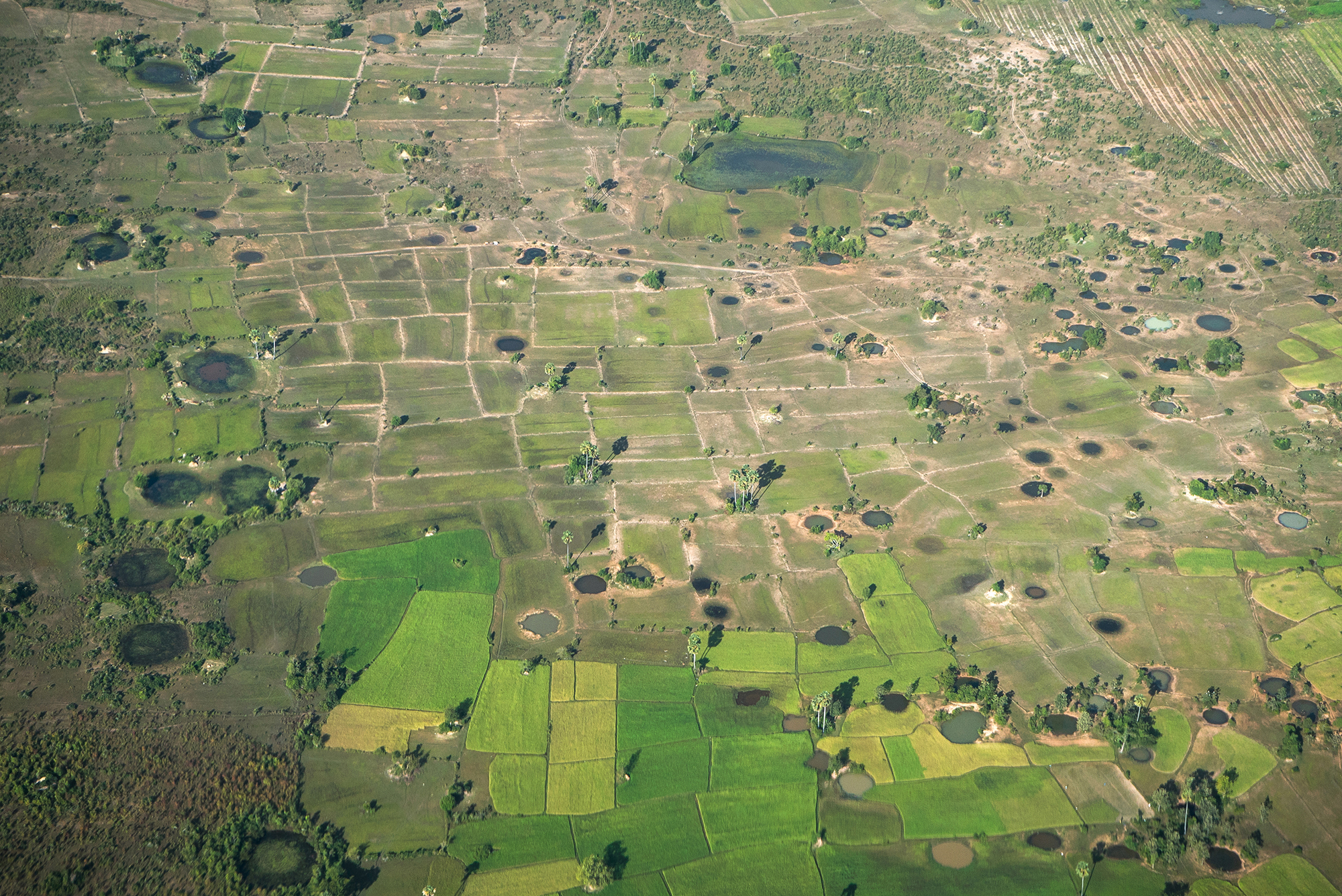
Bomb craters still were visible in Cambodia more than 40 years later

The following events occurred in August 1973:

== August 1, 1973 (Wednesday) ==
- Sheriff T. J. Flournoy reluctantly led deputies in closing "Edna's Fashionable Ranch Boardinghouse", in La Grange, Texas, United States. The house of prostitution had operated since 1844, before the Republic of Texas was admitted as a U.S. state. Texas Governor Dolph Briscoe had informed Flournoy that, if the county did not close the bordello, the Texas Rangers would do so, despite a petition to Briscoe from La Grange businessmen, the local newspaper and some residents. Flournoy told reporters, "It's been there all my life and all my daddy's life and never caused anybody any trouble. Every large city in Texas has things 1,000 times worse." The story of the "Chicken Ranch" would become popularized in the ZZ Top song "La Grange" and dramatized in the 1978 musical and 1982 film The Best Little Whorehouse in Texas.
- The Caribbean Community and Common Market (CARICOM) was inaugurated by the nations of Barbados, Guyana, Jamaica and Trinidad and Tobago.
- Milo Butler was sworn into office as the new Governor-General of the Bahamas, three weeks after the islands became independent; he was the first native Bahamian to hold the office.
- William E. Colby was confirmed as the new Director of the Central Intelligence Agency (CIA) by the U.S. Senate, 83 to 13, after Colby's pledge to not use the CIA solely against foreign nations and not within U.S. borders.
- The U.S. extended South Vietnam a loan of $50,000,000 for the purchase of industrial machinery, spare parts and other manufactured products as part of postwar economic reconstruction. The agreement was made between U.S. Ambassador Graham Martin and South Vietnam's Foreign Minister, Nguyen Phu Duc. On the same day, the Soviet Union pledged economic aid to the Viet Cong for machinery, food, medicine, consumer goods, and "other materials necessary for normalizing the population's life."
- Died: Walter Ulbricht, 80, East German head of state who had served as the Chairman of the State Council since 1960, and had been the de facto leader of the Communist nation as First Secretary of the Socialist Unity Party of Germany from 1950 to 1971.

== August 2, 1973 (Thursday) ==
- A flash fire killed 50 people at the Summerland amusement centre at Douglas, Isle of Man. The four-level building had 4,000 people inside at the time, where hundreds had been attending a rock concert, when a series of explosions went off and the fires began.
- Spiro Agnew, the Vice President of the United States, was notified by a federal prosecutor in Baltimore, George Beall, of a federal investigation, unrelated to the Watergate scandal, for possible violations of bribery, conspiracy and tax fraud arising from receipt of "kickbacks" from persons who benefited from his help. The Washington Post broke revealed on August 7 that Agnew was being accused of federal crimes.
- The nine-day Commonwealth Heads of Government Meeting 1973 opened with the prime ministers of 32 British Commonwealth nations, hosted at Ottawa by Canadian Prime Minister Pierre Trudeau. On the first full day of business, the leaders vote, 31 to 0, to seek a total ban on atomic bomb testing. On August 9, the ministers voted unanimously in favor of black majority rule in Rhodesia.

== August 3, 1973 (Friday) ==
- Four residents were killed and 12 injured when the former Grand Central Hotel in New York City collapsed. At the time of its 1870 opening, it was New York City's most elegant lodging and the largest hotel in the U.S., but had deteriorated more than a century later and was a residential apartment building, the University Hotel, at the time of the accident. The eight-story, 400-room building fell shortly after 5:00 in the afternoon. Most of the 308 persons registered as living at the building had escaped after rumbling began and plaster began falling, but 16 failed to heed warnings to get out.
- James Dreymala of Pasadena, Texas, age 13, became the final murder victim of serial killer Dean Corll. Dreymala had left his home on a bicycle and telephoned his parents to tell them that he was "staying at an all night party." His body was found in a boat shed in Houston, along with the bicycle, five days later.
- Born:
  - Stephen Graham, English character actor known for This Is England and its sequels; in Kirkby, Lancashire
  - Chris Murphy, American politician, U.S. Senator from Connecticut (2013-present), in White Plains, New York

== August 4, 1973 (Saturday) ==
- The Justicialist Party nominated former Argentine president Juan Perón and his wife Isabel Perón as candidates for President and Vice President of Argentina in advance of Argentina's presidential election scheduled for September 23. Mr. and Mrs. Peron accepted the nominations on August 18.
- The Pekan Olahraga Nasional Games opened in Djakarta, Indonesia.
- Died: Sam Katzman, 72, American producer known for his successful low budget films

== August 5, 1973 (Sunday) ==
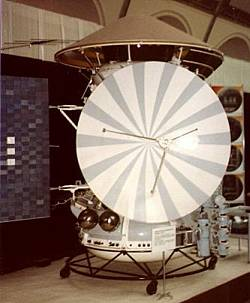
A mockup of the Mars 6 lander

- The Soviet Union launched the Mars 6 probe from Baikonur Cosmodrome. The spacecraft would reach the planet Mars seven months later on March 12, 1974, releasing a lander which would return data for 224 seconds during its descent through the Martian atmosphere before crashing on the surface. Much of the data that was transmitted was unusable.
- The Black September terrorist group threw a hand grenade into a crowded passenger lounge at the airport in Athens and fired pistols, killing three people and injuring 55.
- In Iceland, at a farm near Dragháls, a group of Norse worshipers revived the tradition of the "blót" for the first time since the violent blood sacrifice had been outlawed in the year 1000. The group, the Ásatrúarfélagið held ceremonies in front of a plaster statue of the Norse god Thor.
- Born: Sean Sherk, American mixed martial arts competitor and UFC Lightweight champion 2006 to 2007; in St. Francis, Minnesota
- Died: Vander Broadway, 74, American female impersonator, high-wire performer and trapeze artist who was billed as "Barbette", took an overdose of painkillers to commit suicide.

== August 6, 1973 (Monday) ==
- With 10 days left before the halt of U.S. bombing of Cambodia, a U.S. Air Force B-52 bomber mistakenly bombed a Cambodian Navy base at Neak Luong, killing more than 137 Cambodian servicemen and their families, and wounding 208.
- Skylab 3 astronaut Jack R. Lousma almost doubled the record for a space walk, spending 6 hours and 31 minutes outside of the Skylab space station 270 miles (430 km) above the Earth. Lousma had only expected to spend 3½ hours in deploying a sun shield but encountered difficulties in getting it set up. The previous record had been on June 7 when Charles Conrad Jr. of Skylab 1 and spent 3 hours and 23 minutes outside the space station.
- The Senate of Pakistan (the Aiwān-e-Bālā), with 45 members, met for the first time after a new constitution changed the unicameral Constituent Assembly to a bicameral parliament. Samia Usman Fatah took the oath of office as the first woman Senator in Pakistan.
- Musician Stevie Wonder and his friend, John Harris, were injured when their vehicle crashed into the rear of a logging truck near Salisbury, North Carolina. Wonder was being driven to Durham, where he was scheduled to perform a concert at the Duke University arena. Wonder received a severe brain contusion and remained unresponsive in the initial hours following the crash, but regained partial consciousness the next day and was able to answer simple questions two days after the accident.
- Born: Vera Farmiga, American TV, stage and film actress; in Clifton, New Jersey
- Died:
  - Fulgencio Batista, 72, former Cuban dictator overthrown by Fidel Castro at the end of 1958.
  - James Beck, 44, British television and film actor and comedian known for the role of Private Walker in the BBC sitcom Dad's Army, died suddenly from an attack of pancreatitis after making a public appearance.
  - Wilmoth Houdini (stage name for Frederick Wilmoth Hendricks), 77, Trinidadian-born U.S. calypso singer and recording artist

== August 7, 1973 (Tuesday) ==
- A plea for help over citizens band radio, by a boy by the name of Larry purporting to be stranded inside an overturned truck with his dead father in New Mexico, sparked a search-and-rescue mission in Albuquerque, New Mexico. A massive search would be undertaken for five days before being called off on August 12 with no further calls after that, and the Federal Communications Commission would eventually conclude that the broadcast had been a hoax.
- Zhores Medvedev, a biologist exiled from the Soviet Union and living in London, had his Soviet citizenship revoked and was ordered to surrender his passport to the Soviet Embassy. The next day, TASS, the Communist government's news agency, said that Medvedev had been "fabricating, sending to the West and spreading slanderous materials discrediting the Soviet state and social system and the Soviet people."
- Hermine Braunsteiner became the first convicted Nazi war criminal in the U.S. to be extradited to West Germany for trial. She was found after Nazi hunter Simon Wiesenthal had learned that she was living in New York City as Mrs. Hermine Ryan.
- Died: José Villalonga, 53, coach and manager of the Spanish soccer football team

== August 8, 1973 (Wednesday) ==
- Police in Houston, Texas, learned for the first time of the murders committed by serial killer Dean Corll, after Corll's accomplice, Elmer Wayne Henley, led them to a shallow grave and told them that he had shot and killed Corll. In excavating the spot at a boat storage yard, excavations found the bodies of eight people, including those of three teenagers who had been missing. In the days that followed, more human remains would be found. Henley, 17, and another accomplice, David Owen Brooks, 18, were indicted by a grand jury for murder six days later, on August 14.

Kim Dae-jung campaign poster, 1971

- South Korean politician Kim Dae-jung, who had run against President Park Chung Hee in the 1971 South Korean presidential election and later fled to Japan, was kidnapped at gunpoint from the Hotel Grand Palace in Tokyo by the Korean Central Intelligence Agency (KCIA). Kim had just left a luncheon meeting the leader of the opposition Democratic Unification Party, Yong Il Dong, and another party official, Kim Kyung. As he walked into the hallway, Kim Dae-jung was surrounded by five men, who forced him into a hotel room, then drugged him and took him down to the hotel's parking garage. After being beaten up during five days during interrogations, Kim was released at his home five days later.
- Born: Scott Stapp (stage name for Anthony Scott Flippen), American singer and lead vocalist for the rock band Creed; in Orlando, Florida
- Died:George Wiley, 42, U.S. civil rights leader and founder (in 1966) of the National Welfare Rights Organization, was killed when he fell from his boat into Chesapeake Bay off of the coast of Dares Beach, Maryland.

== August 9, 1973 (Thursday) ==
- Near the Egyptian oasis town of Faiyum, 23 people were killed and 12 injured when the bus they were on fell into a canal after the driver swerved to avoid hitting a donkey.
- The Soviet Union launched its Mars 7 interplanetary probe, with a goal of landing on the planet Mars. On March 9, 1974, the probe would reach Mars and release the lander, but because of a retrorocket failure, the lander would miss the atmosphere and instead fly past the planet at no closer than 1,300 kilometres (810 mi).
- The "Nantua Pillar", a 135 feet (41 m) high, 12,000 ton granite boulder that had served as a local landmark and had hung for more than a century over the French town of Nantua in the Ain département, fell from its mountainside location, 65 minutes after 1,500 of the town's 3,500 residents had been evacuated.
- Europe's first Tandy electronics store (branded in the United States as RadioShack) opened in Belgium in the Antwerp suburb of Aartselaar.
- Died:
  - Nikos Zachariadis, 70, Leader of the Communist Party of Greece during the Greek Civil War, 1946 to 1949, who briefly declared the Provisional Democratic Government in parts of Eastern Greece adjacent to Yugoslavia and Albania
  - Donald Peers, 65, Welsh popular singer known for "In a Shady Nook by a Babbling Brook"

== August 10, 1973 (Friday) ==
- The Skylab 3 astronauts were able to capture the most detailed photograph of a solar flare up to that time.
- The Israeli Air Force intercepted Iraqi Airways Flight 006A shortly after it took off from the airport in Beirut with 74 passengers and a crew of eight, taking the group back home to Baghdad at the end of their vacation. Avoiding a repeat of the shootdown of a Libyan airliner earlier in the year, Israel successfully directed the Iraqi airplane to land at a secret airfield and held the group for eight hours. The Israeli forces had confused the flight with another Caravelle jet, Iraqi Airways Flight 006, which was believed to be bringing Palestinian guerrilla leaders to Lebanon from Vienna. Israel's act of forcing down a civilian airliner outside of its airspace was criticized worldwide, and even the U.S. joined in the UN Security Council resolution on August 15 condemning Israel, marking the first time in five years that the U.S. had sided against its ally.
- Born:
  - Luis Lacalle, President of Uruguay since 2020; in Montevideo
  - Roman Golovchenko, Prime Minister of Belarus (2020–2025); in Zhodzina, Byelorussian SSR, Soviet Union
- Died:
  - Jean Hanson, 53, British biophysicist and co-discoverer of the "sliding filament theory" of muscle contraction from her microscopic study of muscle fibers, died of meningococcal septicaemia, an infection of the brain tissue.
  - Shwe U Daung, 83, popular Burmese mystery story author who created the fictional detective U San Shar
  - Lillian Roxon, 41, Australian author and journalist known for the first encyclopedia of rock music, Lillian Roxon's Rock Encyclopedia, died of an asthma attack

== August 11, 1973 (Saturday) ==
- Clive Campbell, a Jamaican-born American musician who performed under the stage name DJ Kool Herc, originated the hip hop music genre at a party that he and his younger sister Cindy Campbell had organized, the "Back to School Jam" held at 1520 Sedgwick Avenue in the Bronx in New York City.
- At Minsk, the Soviet Red Army announced that seven former soldiers had been convicted in court-martial proceedings of collaboration with German Nazi invaders of the Byelorussian S.S.R. (now Belarus) during World War II. Four were sentenced to death, and the others were given prison terms ranging from 10 to 15 years.
- In one of the rare clashes between warships during the "Cod Wars" between the UK and Iceland over fishing rights, the Iceland Coast Guard patrol vessel ICGV Óðinn rammed the Royal Navy frigate HMS Andromeda in the disputed area more than 12 nautical miles (14 mi) from the Icelandic coast.
- Born: Kiatisuk Senamuang, Thai footballer with 134 caps and 71 goals for the Thailand national team; in Udon Thani
- Died:
  - Peggie Castle, 45, American character actress in film who specialized in portraying ""the other woman", died of cirrhosis of the liver.
  - Giorgio Vizzardelli, 50, Italian serial killer, committed suicide shortly after the end of his sentence.

== August 12, 1973 (Sunday) ==
- U.S. Golfer Jack Nicklaus won his 3rd PGA Championship, his 12th major title of the four major championships of golf. Nicklaus had most recently won the Masters Tournament (his 4th) and the U.S. Open (his 3rd) in 1972, and the British Open in (his 2nd) in 1970. Nicklaus finished four strokes ahead of Australia's Bruce Crampton, who had finished second to Nicklaus in 1972 in the Masters and the U.S. Open.
- Born: Han Jae-suk, South Korean television actor; in Seoul
- Died:
  - Karl Ziegler, 74, German biochemist and 1963 Nobel Prize laureate for his work in micromolecular chemistry.
  - Larry G. Smith, 31, American race car driver and 1972 NASCAR Winston Cup Rookie of the Year, was killed in a crash at the Talladega 500 race in Alabama.
  - Dayanand Bandodkar, 62, Indian politician and the first Chief Minister of Goa, in office since its annexation in 1963

== August 13, 1973 (Monday) ==
- All 85 people aboard Aviaco Flight 118 were killed, along with one person on the ground, when the Caravelle jet crashed into an abandoned farmhouse in Montrove in Spain while attempting to land at Alvedro Airport, in La Coruña at the end of its flight from Madrid.
- U.S. President Nixon's "Phase IV" of price control measures went into effect, ending a price freeze that had been in place as part of Phase III, as part of his controls under the Economic Stabilization Act of 1970.
- Saboteurs in the South American nation of Chile destroyed a high voltage transmission tower while President Salvador Allende was delivering a nationally-televised speech, cutting the power for 35 minutes in most of central Chile.
- The first album of the southern rock band Lynyrd Skynyrd was released, almost nine years after the band had been formed, as MCA Records began sales of (pronounced 'Lĕh-'nérd 'Skin-'nérd).

== August 14, 1973 (Tuesday) ==
- Zulfikar Ali Bhutto was sworn in as Prime Minister of Pakistan, as a new constitution took effect. Bhutto was replaced as president by Fazal Ilahi Chaudhry, and the post of Vice President of Pakistan, held by Nurul Amin, was abolished.
- The U.S. Federal Reserve Board raised its discount rate to 7½ percent, the highest level up to that time for the minimum interest rate charged to American banks for short term loans of currency. Five days earlier, many major U.S. banks had raised their prime lending rate to a record high of 9¼ percent.
- The Venezuelan Supreme Court ruled that former President Marcos Perez Jimenez, who governed the South American nation from 1948 to 1958, was ineligible to run as a candidate in the presidential election scheduled for December 9.
- Born:
  - Paddy McGuinness, English comedian and TV presenter; in Farnworth, Lancashire
  - Sebastián Ortega, Argentine TV producer; in Buenos Aires

== August 15, 1973 (Wednesday) ==
- The American bombing of Cambodia halted at 10:45 in the morning local time (0445 UTC), after a final round of U.S. Air Force bombardment of suspected Khmer Rouge guerrilla enclaves. The halt, originally set for one minute after midnight Washington D.C., officially ended 12 years of American combat in Southeast Asia. During the six and a half months since the Vietnam ceasefire had gone into effect on January 28, the U.S. had dropped 240,000 tons of bombs on Cambodia in 34,410 raids at a cost of $442,800,000. The final mission was flown by two A-7 Corsair jets, whose pilots were Major John Hoskins and Captain Lonnie Ratley. Captain Ratley's plane was the last to land at Korat Air Base in Thailand, but he told reporters that Major Hoskins had dropped the last bombs.
- The U.S. Department of Commerce announced that, for the first time in more than three years, the balance of payments in the country was positive, as the nation's income was greater than its outflow.
- U.S. President Richard M. Nixon delivered a nationally-televised address about the Watergate scandal for the first time, calling on the nation to end its "continued backward-looking obsession with Watergate" and to focus on "matters of far greater importance to all of the American people." Nixon said that he had no prior knowledge of the attempt to place listening devices in Democratic Party headquarters and that he had no knowledge of an attempt to cover-up the scandal until March 21, 1973. He said also that he would not turn over his tape recordings of White House conversations because to do so "would set a precedent that would cripple future Presidents by inhibiting conversations between them and those they look to for advice."
- In the Gulf of Tonkin off North Vietnam, the U.S. Navy aircraft carrier USS Constellation (CVA-64) departed "Yankee Station", a fixed point at sea located 65 miles (105 km) from the coast of North Vietnam. Constellation was the last aircraft carrier to operate at the point, where American aircraft carriers had gathered since 1966.
- The ITV television network broadcast the first episode of the British situation comedy Man About the House, about single man Robin Tripp (Richard O'Sullivan) sharing a flat with two single women, Chrissy Paula Wilcox and Jo Sally Thomsett in a building owned by the Ropers (Yootha Joyce and Brian Murphy), with Robin pretending to be gay in order to avoid the owners' objections. The format would be adapted for American audiences as Three's Company in 1977.
- The members of the rock band "Sick Man of Europe" renamed the act "Cheap Trick", after playing a concert in Bettendorf, Iowa the evening before. Bassist Tom Petersson coined the new name after commenting that the British rock band Slade had "used every cheap trick in the book" during a concert that he had attended.
- Born:
  - Swadhin Kumar Mandal, Indian Bengali chemist
  - Lubna Azabal, Belgian film and TV actress; in Brussels

== August 16, 1973 (Thursday) ==
- An armed Libyan attempted to hijack a Middle East Airlines Boeing 720, with 119 people aboard, as it was flying over Cyprus on a flight from Benghazi in Libya to Beirut in Lebanon. Pursuant to his demands, the plane landed in Israel at Lod International Airport in Tel Aviv, where he held a press conference and surrendered to the authorities. He was placed in an Israeli psychiatric hospital.
- Born: Garry Charles, English horror and fantasy novelist and filmmaker; in Bedford, Bedfordshire
- Died:
  - Selman Waksman, 85, Ukrainian-born biochemist, recipient of the Nobel Prize in Physiology or Medicine
  - Vernon Rudolph, 58, American businessman who founded the Krispy Kreme doughnuts chain of stores and product lines.

== August 17, 1973 (Friday) ==
- U.S. baseball star Willie Mays, wrapping up his career with the New York Mets, hit the 660th and final home run of his Major League Baseball career in a game against the Cincinnati Reds.
- Died:
  - Conrad Aiken, 84, American poet and U.S. Poet Laureate, 1950 to 1952
  - Jean Barraqué, 45, French composer
  - U.S. Navy Admiral Arthur W. Radford, 77, Chairman of the Joint Chiefs of Staff 1953 to 1957
  - Günther Pancke, 74, German Nazi war criminal who had been charged with law enforcement during the German occupation of Denmark.
  - Paul Williams, 34, former lead singer for The Temptations, committed suicide near his home in Detroit.

== August 18, 1973 (Saturday) ==
- Aeroflot Flight A-13 crashed in the Soviet Union shortly after the An-24B turboprop took off from Baku, in the Azerbaijani SSR, to Fort-Shevchenko in the Kazakh SSR, killing 56 of the 64 passengers and crew. The left engine failed as the airplane lifted off, and as the pilot steered to the left in order to attempt an emergency landing, the left wingtip struck a cable at 120 feet (37 m).

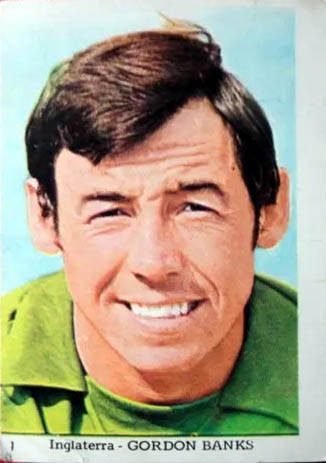
Goalkeeper Gordon Banks

- In soccer football, Gordon Banks, the goalkeeper for the England national football team and for Stoke City F.C., announced his retirement from the sport on the eve of the new season. Described by the press as "the world's greatest goalkeeper", had lost the sight in one eye after a car accident in October.
- The annual All-American Soap Box Derby in Akron, Ohio was won by a 14-year-old boy from Boulder, Colorado, who finished the downhill race in his homemade unpowered car and won a $7,500 college scholarship. The victory was taken away two days later for cheating, after race officials found that the user's car had an electromagnet that allowed it to be pulled forward as the track's metal starting plate fell, allowing him a slight head-start against the other competitors.
- Born: Victoria Coren, English writer, television presenter and poker player, in Hammersmith, London, the daughter of journalist Alan Coren
- Died: Alice Stevenson, 112, the oldest resident of the United Kingdom ever, up to that time.

== August 19, 1973 (Sunday) ==
- A three-month ban on the sale of beef went into effect in the South American nation of Uruguay as a measure to boost the country's exports of beef. Sales of beef were still allowed for the military, for hospitals, and for charitable organizations.
- George Papadopoulos was sworn in as President of Greece after his June 1 overthrow of the monarchy had been confirmed by voters in a referendum.
- Bruce Lee's final martial arts film before his death, Enter the Dragon, premiered in the United States 30 days after his death on July 20, and would become one of the most profitable movies of all time, with revenues of $400,000,000 after being filmed with a budget of $850,000.
- Born: Crown Princess Mette-Marit of Norway; as Mette-Marit Tjessem Høiby in Kristiansand
- Died: Willy Rey (stage name for Wilhelmina Rietveld), 23, Dutch-born Canadian model and Playboy magazine feature in February 1971, died of an overdose of barbiturates.

== August 20, 1973 (Monday) ==
- In the Kingdom of Laos, former Laotian Army General Thao Ma led 60 officers in an attempt to overthrow the government. Arriving in the capital, Vientiane, he and his group took over the Wattay International Airport and seized several AT-28 fighter bombers and tried, unsuccessfully, to bomb the home and office of Major General Kouprasith Abhay. While General Thao was still in flight, Royal Laotian troops retook the airport and his airplane was shot down as he was attempting to land. He was rescued and survived the crash, but then put into a truck where he was driven to Kouprasith's headquarters, where he was executed by one of Kouprasith's bodyguards. The Laotian government executed 11 other coup participants the next day by firing squad.
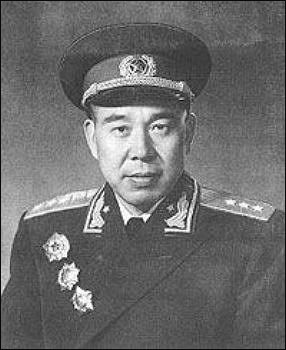
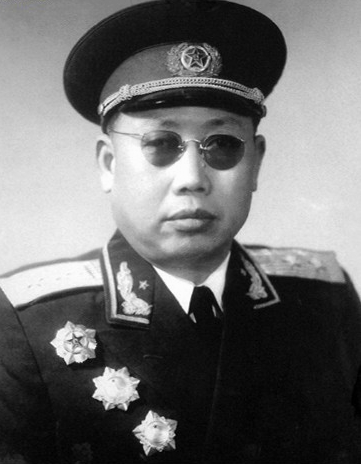
Dismissed from China's Politburo, Huang Yongsheng and Li Zuopeng
- The Politburo of the ruling Chinese Communist Party voted to dismiss four Politburo members, Huang Yongsheng, Wu Faxian, Li Zuopeng and Qiu Huizuo. The four would be replaced at the Central Committee meeting on August 30.
- More than 200 people were killed in Mexico in a flash flood that swept through the city of Irapuato in Guanajuato state.
- U.S. President Nixon grabbed and shoved his White House Press Secretary, Ron Ziegler, into a crowd of reporters after getting angry at being followed. Nixon shouted, "I don't want any press with me!," spun Ziegler around and shoved him, and yelled "Take care of it!" The incident was captured on film by a CBS News crew that had been covering Nixon's visit to a Veterans of Foreign Wars convention in New Orleans. A few years later, Ziegler would tell the Washington Journalism Review that Nixon apologized to him in front of the entire staff and said "I'm sorry for what I did back there."
- De Temporum Fine Comoedia, the last work of Carl Orff, premièred at the Salzburg Music Festival by Herbert von Karajan and the Cologne Radio Symphony Orchestra and Chorus.
- Born: Todd Helton, American baseball player, in Knoxville, Tennessee

== August 21, 1973 (Tuesday) ==
- Major Hubert O'Neill, the coroner in the inquest on the "Bloody Sunday" massacre, accused the British Army of "sheer unadulterated murder" after the coroner's jury returned an open verdict with no indictments recommended against anyone. On January 30, 1972, the British Army shot 26 unarmed civilians in Derry, and killed 14.
- Born:
  - Sergey Brin, Soviet-born U.S. computer scientist who co-founded Google with Larry Page in 1998; in Moscow, Russian SFSR, Soviet Union
  - Nikolai Valuev, Russian heavyweight boxer and the World Boxing Association champion from 2005 to 2009; in Leningrad, Russian SFSR, Soviet Union
  - Ken Noguchi, Japanese mountaineer who became, in 1999, the youngest person to scale the "Seven Summits" (the highest mountains on each of the seven continents); in Boston in the U.S. to a Japanese diplomat

== August 22, 1973 (Wednesday) ==
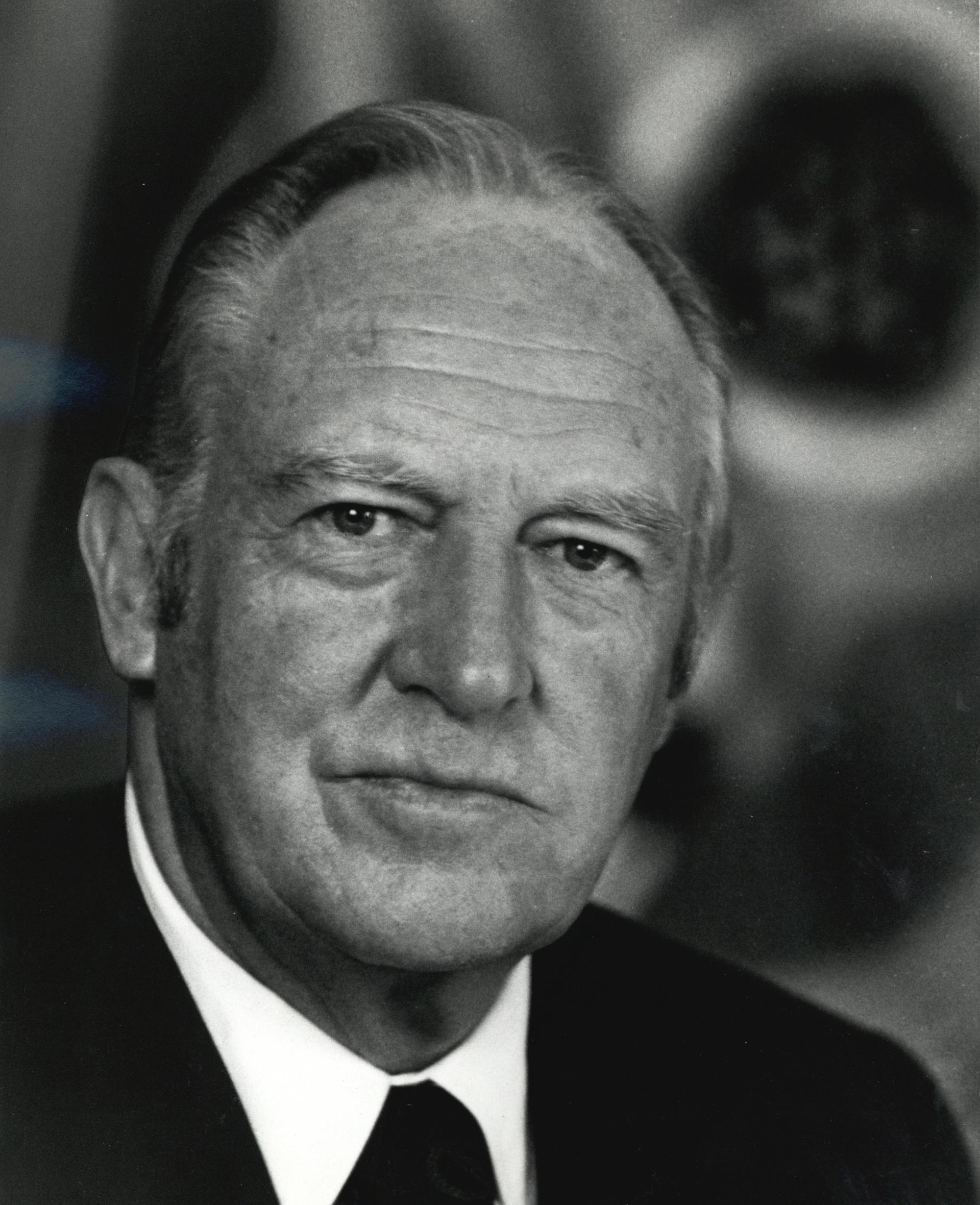
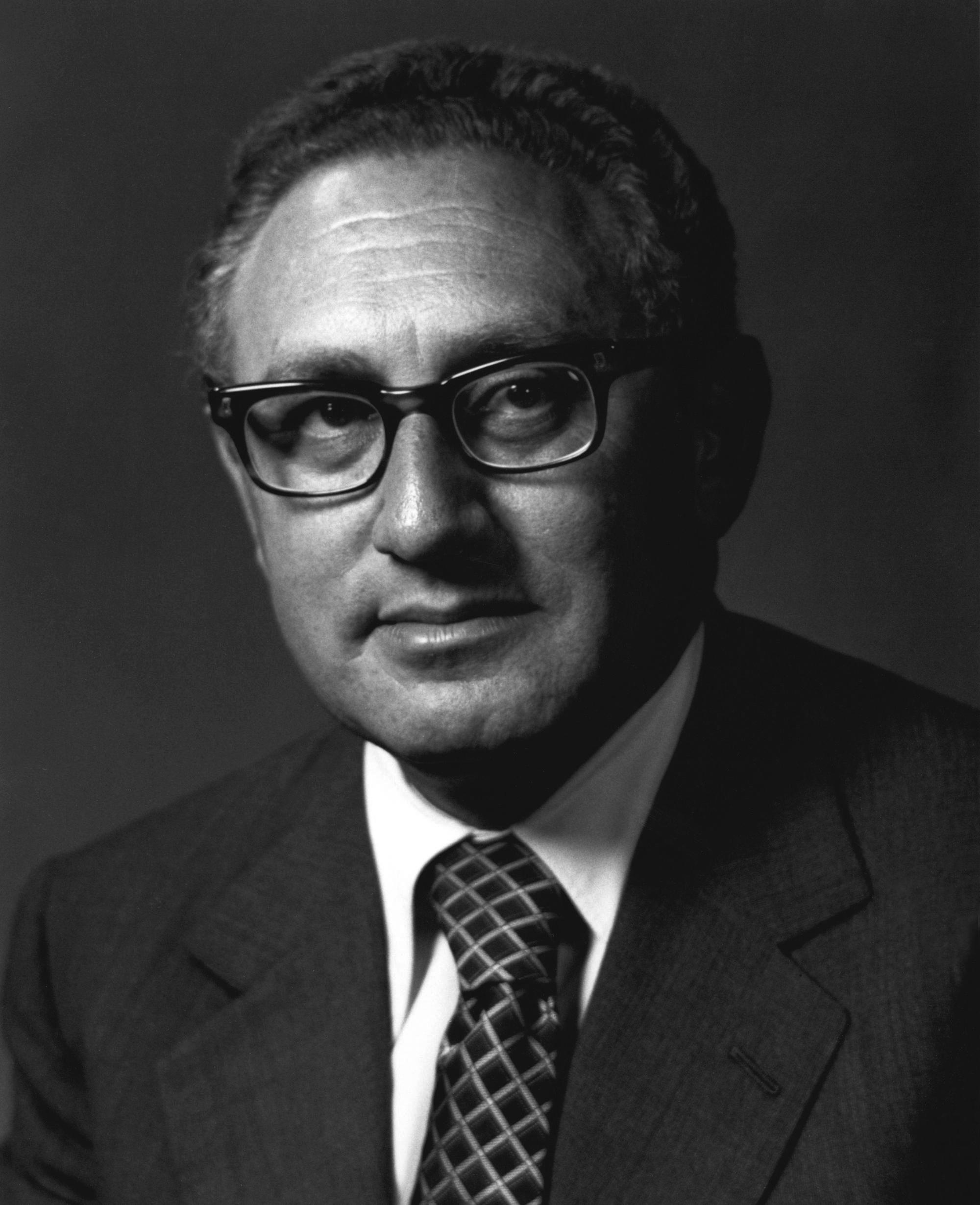
U.S. Secretary of State Rogers out, Kissinger in
- The resignation of William P. Rogers as U.S. Secretary of State was announced by President Nixon, who said that he would nominate his National Security Adviser, Henry Kissinger, to the position. Rogers, the only member of Nixon's first Cabinet who was still in office, formally departed on September 4 to return to a private law practice.
- In Chile the Chamber of Deputies voted overwhelmingly, 81 to 47, to condemn President Salvador Allende for violations of the South American nation's constitution during the attempts to suppress nationwide strikes. While the Deputies had sufficient votes in favor of an impeachment trial, and the Allende's opposition had 30 of the 50 seats in the Chilean Senate, the opposition Senators were still four votes short of the necessary 34 votes necessary for a two-thirds majority to remove Allende from office. The Chilean military would take their own action to remove Allende from office 20 days later.
- The crash in Colombia of an Avianca DC-3 killed 16 of the 17 people on board, after it crashed into a hillside following its departure from Villavicencio to Yopal.
- Born: Kristen Wiig, American actress and comedienne known for Saturday Night Live, and film screenwriter known for Bridesmaids; in Canandaigua, New York

== August 23, 1973 (Thursday) ==
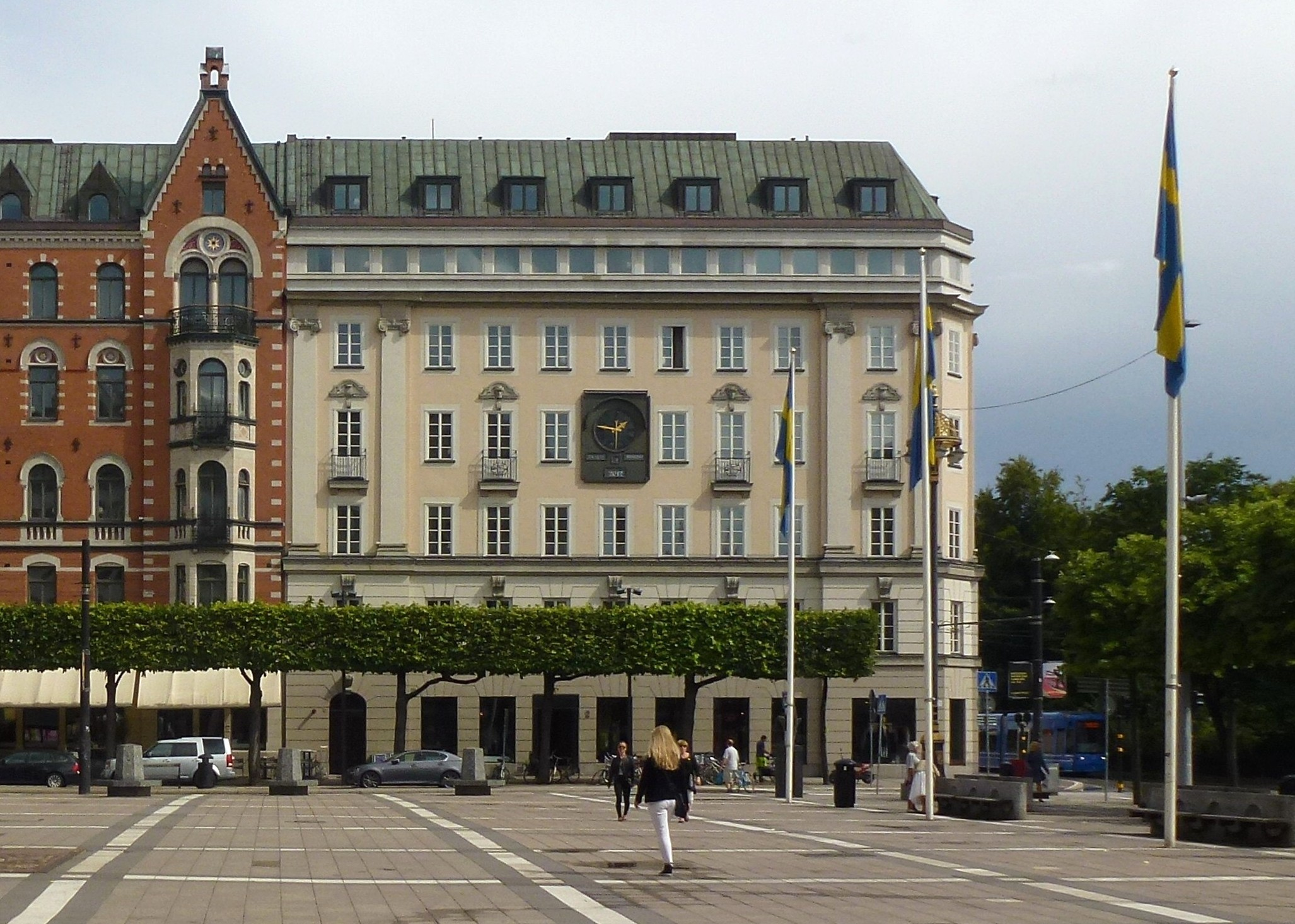
The Kreditbanken building

- The Norrmalmstorg robbery, the first criminal event in Sweden covered by live television, began in Stockholm as Jan-Erik Olsson entered the Kreditbanken bank on Norrmalmstorg Square, displayed a sub-machine gun, and took four employees hostage. After firing three shots at responding policemen, he demanded that the police release convicted robber Clark Olofsson, that the two be provided three million Swedish krona (equivalent at the time to $650,000 U.S.), and that they be provided a car and free passage to a flight out of Sweden, all of which was done. The police balked, however, at allowing the duo to take a hostage with them to the airport. Police would lock the two robbers and four hostages inside the bank's vault as the standoff continued, and would end the incident with a tear gas assault after five days. The incident would become famous for the origin of the term Stockholm syndrome, referring to hostages becoming sympathetic to their captors, in that the four hostages refused to testify against Olsson and Olofsson.
- A nationwide railway strike was called in Canada by the Associated Railway Unions. Canada's Parliament forced a settlement after nine days to end the strike.
- An epidemic of cholera began in Italy from polluted seafood, as contaminated mussels caused several cases in Naples. By September 3, the illness had spread to West Germany and had killed 18 people in Italy alone.
- The Association of Tennis Professionals began publishing its weekly rankings of men's professional tennis players, using a computerized system based points assigned for a player's average finishes in the previous 52 weeks in tournaments (which were, in turn, assigned different values based on prized). The first rankings were done in advance of the U.S. Open, with Ilie Nastase of Romania at the top of a list of 186 players who had been in at least 12-tournaments in a year.

== August 24, 1973 (Friday) ==
- King Mohammed Zahir Shah of Afghanistan, who had been overthrown on July 17 by Mohammed Daoud, announced from his exile in Rome that he was abdicating the throne in order to become a loyal citizen of the new republic. The abdication made the former crown prince, Ahmad Shah Khan, head of the Barakzai dynasty.
- Born:
  - Dave Chappelle, American comedian and TV actor; in Washington, D.C.
  - Inge de Bruijn, Dutch swimmer who won four Olympic gold medals in individual events (in 2000 and 2004); in Barendrecht
  - Grey DeLisle, American comedian and voice actress; in Fort Ord, California

== August 25, 1973 (Saturday) ==
- The receipt of a large number of letter bombs in the mail, all sent from West London, began with the sending to department stores of 4 ounces (110 g) of explosives hidden in ordinary envelopes. According to Scotland Yard, each of the bombs "was hidden inside a BBC music pamphlet", with the explosive charge detonating as soon as the book was opened. On August 27, a bomb mailed to the British Embassy in Washington, D.C. exploded, causing a secretary to lose her left hand and mangling her right hand. and the British government issued a worldwide alert the next day.
- The North American Soccer League, the major professional soccer football league in North America, played its championship game, with a new team, the Philadelphia Atoms, defeating the Dallas Tornado, 2 to 0 before a crowd of 18,824 at Texas Stadium. Englishman John Best, playing for Dallas, made the first score, albeit for the other side on an accidental own goal at the 65 minute mark. Bill Straub, a U.S. player for the Atoms, made the other goal with five minutes to play.
- At the World University Games in Moscow, the U.S. national basketball team avenged the 51-50 loss of the U.S. in the 1972 Summer Olympics by beating the Soviet Union (whose team had six of the 1972 Olympic gold medalists), 75 to 67.
- A team from Tainan in Taiwan won the Little League World Series after Huang Ching-huy, who had pitched a perfect game at the beginning of the 8-team tournament, threw his third consecutive no-hitter, defeating the U.S. West team from Tucson, Arizona, 12 to 0.

== August 26, 1973 (Sunday) ==
- Two days before he was scheduled to give a press conference in France to announce a challenge to Chad's dictator Francois Tombalbaye, Dr. Outel Bono was assassinated. Bono was getting into his car in Paris when a gunman fired two shots at him from a revolver. No person was ever arrested for the crime.
- The Ulster Volunteer Force terrorist group in Northern Ireland placed a time bomb outside of the St. Patrick's and St. Brigid's Church, timing it so that it would explode just as Roman Catholic worshipers were leaving the services. Church services ran late, and most of the intended victims were still in the building when the bomb exploded. Outside, however, 50 people were injured.
- The first Women's Equality Day in the U.S. was observed to commemorate the August 26, 1920, ratification of the Nineteenth Amendment to the United States Constitution, which granted women the right to vote. On the same day, the National Women's Hall of Fame inducted its first 20 members.
- The last national elections in South Vietnam were held, as voters chose from four lists of candidates for the 30 seats of the Senate of the Republic of Viet Nam. President Nguyen Van Thieu's slate of Social Democratic Alliance candidates won the vote.
- The annual American bicycle riding event now called RAGBRAI (Register's Annual Great Bicycle Ride Across Iowa) began as roughly 200 riders departed from Sioux City, Iowa, along with feature writers John Karras and Don Kaul of The Des Moines Register, for "The Great Six-Day Bicycle Ride". The initial west-to-east bicycle tour pedaled to Davenport, with overnight stops at Storm Lake, Fort Dodge, Ames, Des Moines, and Williamsburg, and 114 cyclists went the full distance, arriving at Davenport on August 31.
- Born: Inder Kumar, Indian film actor; in Jaipur, Rajasthan state (d. 2017)
- Died: Robert Lelièvre, 30, French-born Danish folk rock musician and songwriter, committed suicide in Copenhagen.

== August 27, 1973 (Monday) ==
- The ruins of the famous U.S. Navy ironclad gunboat USS Monitor were found more than 110 years after the vessel had sunk in the Atlantic Ocean off of the coast of Cape Hatteras at North Carolina. On March 8, 1862, during the U.S. Civil War, the Monitor had defeated the CSS Virginia, the Confederate Navy's most powerful vessel, and an adaptation of the USS Merrimack, in a battle memorialized as "Monitor vs. Merrimac". Monitor sank in a storm less than 10 months later, on December 21, 1862, with the loss of 16 of its crew.
- All 42 people aboard and Aerocóndor Colombia turboprop airplane were killed when the Lockheed L-188A Electra airplane crashed into the side of a mountain three minutes after taking off from Bogota on a flight to Cartagena.
- The Barringer Trophy, awarded for the longest distance soaring flight from any type of launching method other than airplane tow, was regained by its holder, Wallace Scott II, after a flight of 639 miles (1,028 km) from Odessa, Texas, to Kearney, Nebraska, in a Schleicher ASW 12.
- The 14-team National Hockey League announced that it would expand to 16 and realign from two divisions to four for the 1974-1975 season.

== August 28, 1973 (Tuesday) ==
- A 7.1 magnitude earthquake killed at least 539 people after striking the Mexican states of Veracruz and Puebla. Hardest hit were the city of Orizaba in Veracruz, where a 12-story-tall apartment building collapsed and killed over 100 people, and the town of Ciudad Serdán in Puebla.
- The Delhi Agreement between India, Pakistan and Bangladesh, was signed by the foreign ministers of the three adjacent nations in India in order to provide for the voluntary repatriation of persons held in each nation who wished to return home, including former Bengali East Pakistan (which became Bangladesh) bureaucrats and officers who had been interned in West Pakistan (which remained as Pakistan), as well as people in Urdu language speakers in Bangladesh who wished to relocate to Pakistan, and several thousand Pakistan prisoners of war incarcerated in India.
- American commercial diver Paul J. Havlena died of a pneumothorax from a pulmonary barotrauma while in saturation and conducting a bell dive from the pipe laying and derrick barge L.B. Meaders to perform non-routine maintenance on a pipeline in the North Sea. Havlena's death was caused by a malfunction in his breathing equipment, resulting in a pressure imbalance in his diving helmet.
- Died:
  - "Joe Diamond" (Natale Evola), 66, American mobster who had been the boss of the Bonanno crime family in New York City from 1968 to 1971
  - Fructuoso Orduna, 80, Spanish sculptor

== August 29, 1973 (Wednesday) ==
- The British submarine Pisces III sank in the Atlantic Ocean south west of Ireland. In the deepest underwater rescue in history, the submarine was raised after a multi-agency rescue effort saved both crewmembers, Roger Mallinson and Roger Chapman, who had been trapped for 76 hours with a dwindling air supply in 1,375-foot (419 m) deep water.
- All 17 civilian passengers on a U.S. Air Force were killed in the crash of a Lockheed C-141 Starlifter, along with 7 of the 8 crew, as it was approaching the Torrejón Air Base near Madrid with the wives and children of USAF personnel.
- Born:
  - Tom Six, Netherlands filmmaker known for his trilogy of Human Centipede horror films; in Alkmaar
  - Thomas Tuchel, German football manager who has led the England national team since 2025; in Krumbach, Bavaria, West Germany.

== August 30, 1973 (Thursday) ==
- In the African nation of Chad, President François Tombalbaye announced his policy of Authenticité, the Africanization of personal names and place names to replace those given when the area was under French colonial rule. The policy was similar to the authenticité policy introduced in 1971 by President Mobutu Sese Seko in Zaire (now the Democratic Republic of the Congo). The Chadian dictator changed his name to N’Garta Tombalbaye, and the capital, Fort Lamy, was renamed as N'Djamena while Fort Archambault was changed to Sarh.
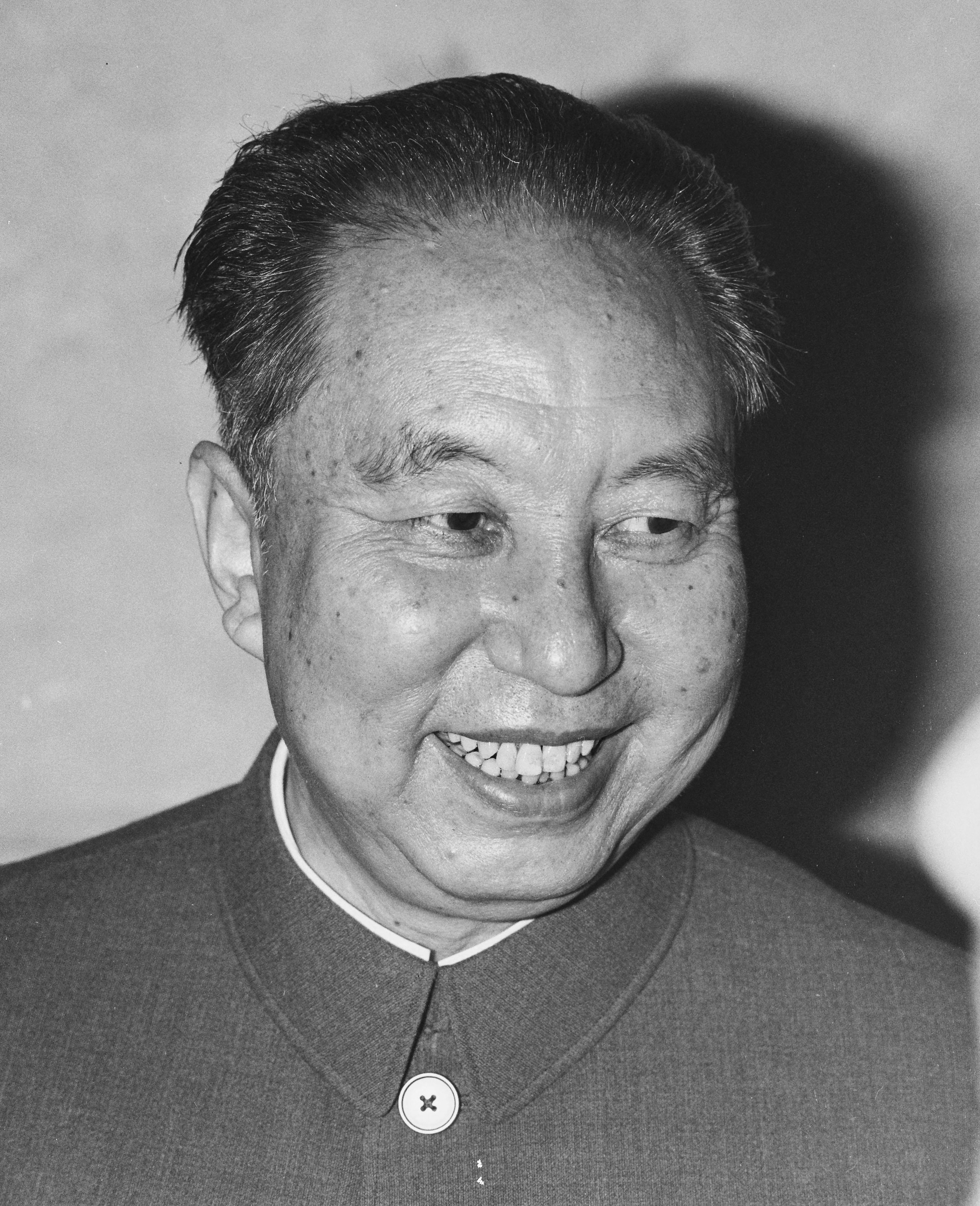
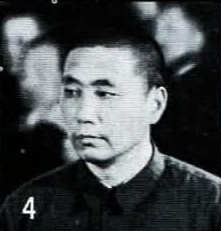
Hua Guofeng and Wang Hongwen of the Communist Chinese Politburo
- The 10th Politburo of the Chinese Communist Party, the de facto policy-making body of the People's Republic of China, was elected by the Central Committee of the Chinese Communist Party, with 21 full members and 4 alternate members. Vacancies in the full membership were filled as two new full members (Wang Hongwen and Hua Guofeng) were added, and three alternates (Ji Dengkui, Li Desheng and Wang Dongxing were promoted. Mao Zedong was re-elected as Chairman of the Party. To replace the vacated office of the single Vice Chairman, Lin Biao (who had been killed after an unsuccessful attempt to overthrow Chairman Mao in 1971), five persons (Zhou Enlai, new member Wang Hongwen, Kang Sheng, Ye Jianying and Li Desheng were named as Vice Chairmen, with Wang being named as the third most powerful person in the Chinese Communist Party, behind Chairman Mao Zedong and Prime Minister Zhou Enlai.
- The last legal execution in Bolivia took place as convicted murderer Melquiades Suxo Quispe was put to death.
- Apostle Arsenio T. Ferriol registered the Pentecostal Missionary Church of Christ (4th Watch) with the Philippine government.
- Died:
  - Michael Dunn (stage name for Gary Neil Miller), 38, diminutive (3'10" or 117 cm tall) American TV, stage and film actor known for his recurring role on The Wild Wild West as the villain Dr. Loveless, and for his Oscar-nominated role in Ship of Fools, died of heart failure from cor pulmonale while in London for the filming of The Abdication.
  - Jean Sénac, 46, Algerian author and poet, was murdered.
  - Lauren Ford, 82, American painter and children's book author

== August 31, 1973 (Friday) ==
- The Soviet Communist Party newspaper Pravda published a letter from multiple members of the Union of Soviet Writers condemning writer Aleksandr Solzhenitsyn and nuclear physicist Andrei Sakharov.
- Died:
  - John Ford (professional name for John M. Feeney), 79, U.S. film director, winner of four Academy Awards for Best Director, known for The Informer, The Grapes of Wrath, How Green Was My Valley, and The Quiet Man
  - Mary Merrall (stage name for Elsie Lloyd), 83, English stage, film and television actress
