= Anni (given name) =

- Pronunciation: /ˈæni/
- Gender: Female

Other names
- See also: Anne, Ann, Annie

Anni is a feminine given name. It is a pet form of Anne and Ann. Notable people with the name include:

- Anni Albers (1899–1994), German-American textile artist
- Anni Anwander, West German slalom canoeist
- Anni B Sweet (born 1987), Spanish musical artist
- Anni Baobei (born 1974), Chinese novelist
- Anni Becker (1926–2009), German musician
- Anni Biechl (born 1940), German sprinter
- Anni Bissø (born 1969), Danish sport shooter
- Anni Blomqvist (1909–1990), Finnish-Swedish novelist
- Anni Bruk (1924–1998), Austrian shot putter
- Anni Cermak (born 1940), Austrian gymnast
- Anni Daulter, American cookbook author
- Anni Dewani (1982–2010), Indian-Swedish female murder victim
- Anni Domingo (born 1950), British actress, director, and writer
- Anni Espar (born 1993), Spanish water polo player
- Anni Finsterer, Australian actress
- Anni Flinck (1915–1990), Finnish politician
- Anni Friesinger-Postma (born 1977), German speed skater
- Anni Frind (1900–1987), German opera singer
- Anni Hammergaard Hansen (1930–2000), Danish badminton player
- Anni Hartikainen (born 2003), Finnish footballer
- Anni Holdmann (1900–1960), German sprinter
- Anni Huotari (1874–1943), Finnish politician
- Anni Järvenpää (born 2000), Finnish figure skater
- Anni Keisala (born 1997), Finnish ice hockey player
- Anni Krahnstöver (1904–1961), German politician
- Anni Kronbichler (born 1963), Austrian alpine skier
- Anni Kärävä (born 2000), Finnish freestyle skier
- Anni Laakmann (1937–2025), German chess player
- Anni Lanz (born 1945), Swiss human rights activist
- Anni Matthiesen (born 1964), Danish politician
- Anni Montonen (born 2000), Finnish ice hockey player
- Anni Nersisyan
- Anni Neumann (born 1926), East German politician
- Anni Pede-Erdkamp (1940–2025), German long-distance runner
- Anni Penttilä (1993), Finnish mountaineer
- Anni Podimata (born 1962), Greek politician
- Anni Rehborn (1904–1986), German swimmer
- Anni Reifinger, West German slalom canoeist who competed in the 1950s
- Anni Rossi (born c. 1986), American singer
- Anni Rättyä (1934–2021), Finnish javelin thrower
- Anni Savolainen-Tapaninen (1875–1952), Finnish politician
- Anni Schaad (1911–1988), German jewellery maker
- Anni Sinnemäki (born 1973), Finnish politician
- Anni Steuer (1913–1990s), German hurdler
- Anni Stolte (1915–1994), German swimmer
- Anni Swan (1875–1958), Finnish writer
- Anni Vuohijoki (born 1988), Finnish weightlifter
- Anni von Westrum Baldaugh (1881–1953), American painter

== See also ==
- Anni Manchi Sakunamule, 2023 Indian Telugu-language romantic family drama film
- Anni Ribelli, 1996 Italian Argentine romantic drama film
- Annie (given name)
- Anna (disambiguation)
