= Samia =

Samia or SAMIA may refer to:

== Arts and entertainment ==
- Samia, a film produced by Humbert Balsan
- Samia (musician), an American musician (Samia Najimy Finnerty)
- Samia (play), a play by Menander
- South Australian Music Industry Awards, now defunct music awards

== Mythology ==
- Samia (mythology), daughter of Maeander and wife of Ancaeus, in Greek mythology
- Samia, an epithet of the goddess Hera, in Greek mythology

== People ==
- Samia (name)
- Samia tribe, a Luhya tribe in western Kenya and southeastern Uganda

== Places ==
- North Samia and South Samia, two administrative locations in Funyula division of Busia County in Western Kenya
- Samia, Iran, a village in Bushehr Province, Iran
- Samia, Niger, a town near Zinder

== Other uses ==
- Samia (moth), a Saturniinae moth genus

== See also ==
- Samiya (disambiguation)
