= Samee =

- Pronunciation: Arabic: [sæˈmiːʕ, sa-] Urdu: [səmiː]
- Gender: Male

Origin
- Origin: Arabic
- Meaning: Hearer
- Region of origin: Arabia

Samee (Arabic: سميع), also spelt as Sameeh is a name which means one who hears. It is a convention to use either a prefix "Abd-" or a suffix "-Ullah" along the name, which gives meanings of "Abdul Samee" - "the servant/slave of All-Hearer/ All-Hearing" or Samiullah/Sameeullah - "All-Hearer/ All-Hearing of God" respectively.

"As-Samee" is one of the names of Allah meaning the" All-Hearer/ All-Hearing" - which the common expression that it is only Allah who hears and responds. According to Islamic tradition, a Muslim may not be given any of the names of God in exactly the same form. Likewise nobody may be named As-Samee (The All Hearing), but may be named Samee (Hearer). This is because of the belief that God is almighty and no human being is the equivalent to God.

The name Samee should not be confused with another Arabic name Sami written as سامي in Arabic. Sami is also given name in Scandinavia, America and many other countries. It has different origins and meanings. For example, the Arabic Sami means elevated or sublime.

The feminine counterpart of this name in Arabic is Sameea or Samiya (سمیعة) meaning one who listens.

== People ==
- Mohammad Abdul-Samee Al-Dmeiri
- Samiya Mumtaz

== See also ==
- Sami (name)
