= Samir Rafi =

Egyptian painter (1926–2004)

Samir Rafi (1926–2004) was an Egyptian modernist painter who combined modern style with lines inspired from Ancient Egypt. His pieces primarily represented modern Egypt and the surrounding region. He was inspired by cubism and surrealism, creating artworks both figurative and abstract.

== Biography ==
Samir Rafi was born to an Egyptian father and a Lebanese mother. His younger brother is the visual artist Sami Rafi. He participated in his first exhibition at the of age 17, while he was a student of watercolour painter Shafiq Rizq. In 1944 and 1945 he took part in the exhibitions organised by the group Art et Liberté. Samir Rafi studied at the College of Fine Arts in Cairo, where he obtained a diploma with a specialisation in decorative arts in 1948. That year he joined the Contemporary Art Group movement. He then pursued a doctorate at the Sorbonne University in Paris, where he was one of André Lhote's students.

Rafi taught at the College of Fine Arts in Cairo and mounted exhibitions in Egypt. He later taught arts and history in Algiers.

One of his paintings reached the price of 87,500 GBP at a Christie's sale in 2019.

== Artworks ==
- Untitled, 1960, oil on canvas, 162.5 x 138 cm, sold 87,500 GPB in 2019 at Christie's
- Nus, 1945, oil on canvas, 173 x 163 cm, collection Cheikh Hassan M. A. Al Thani
- La Sorcière, 1946, oil on canvas, 77 x 46 cm, collection Nadim Elias
- Momie ressuscitée, oil on burlap laid down on panel, 1959, 215 x 68 cm, sold for 35,000 GPB in 2018 at Christie's
