= Sami Uotila =

Sami Uotila may refer to:

== People ==
- Sami Uotila (actor) (born 1971), Finnish actor
- Sami Uotila (skier) (born 1976), Finnish alpine skier

== See also ==
- Sami (name)
