= Unknown Soldier Memorial (Egypt) =

War memorial in Cairo, Egypt

Coordinates: 30°03′54″N 31°18′50″E

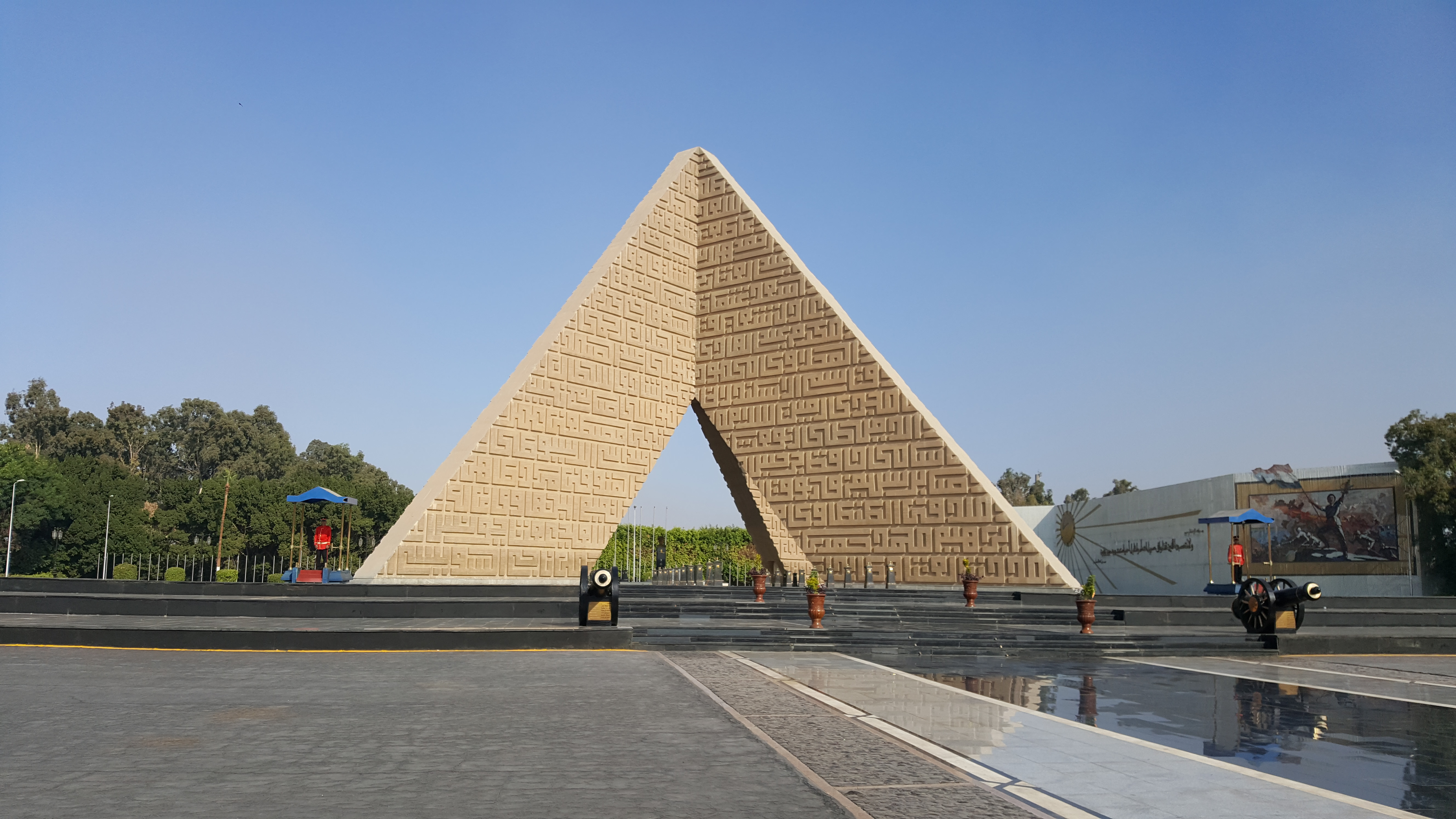
The Unknown Soldier Memorial

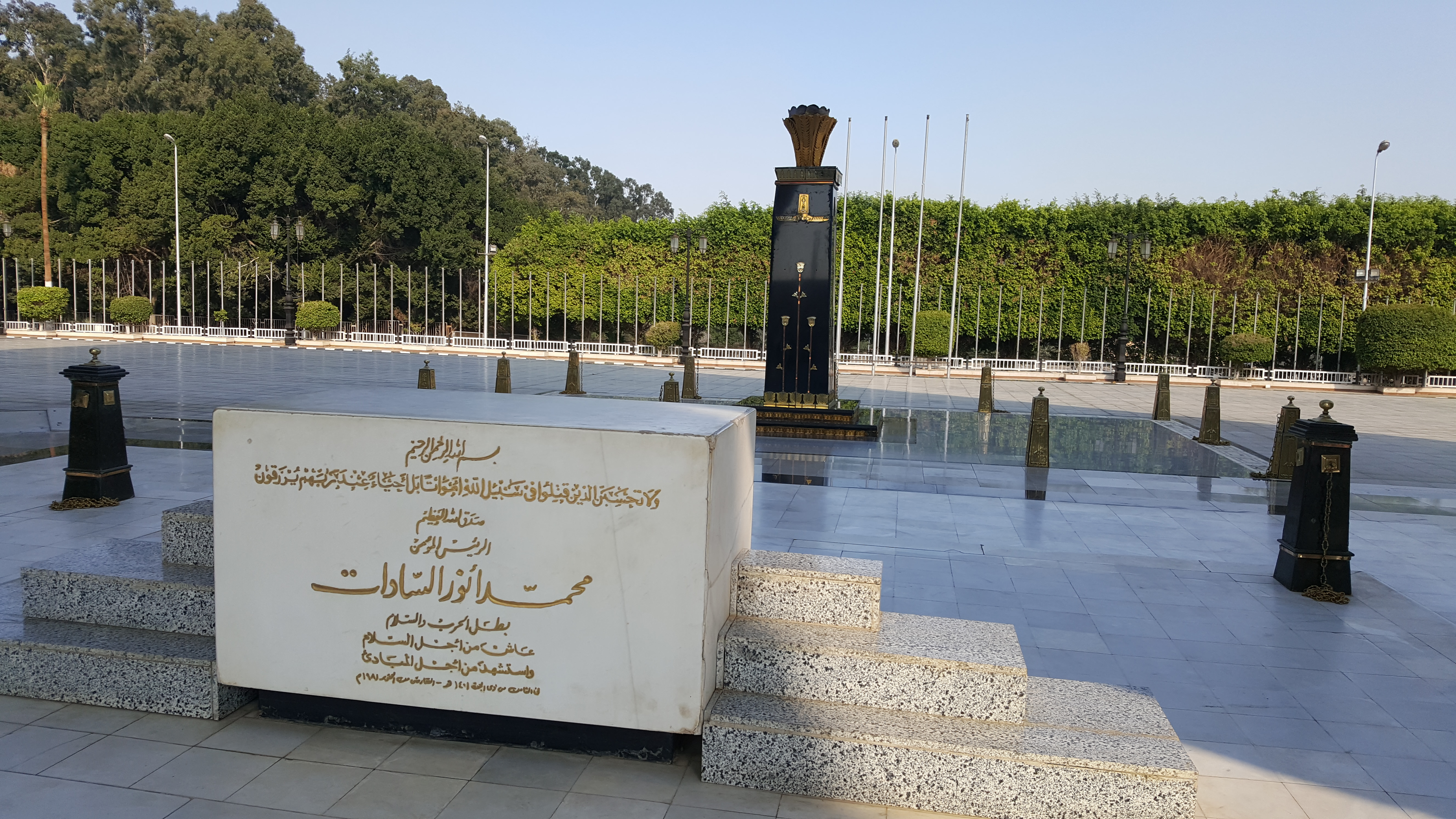
Tomb of Anwar Sadat who is buried on the grounds of the memorial

The Unknown Soldier Memorial in Cairo is a pyramid-shaped monument in Nasr City. Its construction was ordered by president Anwar Sadat in 1974 in honor of Egyptians and Arabs who lost their lives in the 1973 October War. It was inaugurated in October 1975. The site was also chosen for the president's tomb after his assassination in October 1981.

The monument is made of concrete and resembles a hollow pyramid, with a height of 25 meters, and a base width of 14.3 meters. The four pillars are 1.9 meters thick, and are inscribed with 71 symbolic names. At the center of the base is a solid basalt cube representing the soldier's tomb. It was designed by the artist Sami Rafi, a professor in the Faculty of Fine Arts in Cairo. A small memorial to those who died in the 1973 war is present in the 6th of October Panorama.
