= Samia (name) =

Samia, also spelt Samiya is both a feminine given name and a surname. It is often derived from the Arabic: سامية sāmiyah.

Notable people with the name include:

== Given name ==
- Samia Abbou, Tunisian lawyer and noble and shoot
- Samia al-Aghbari, Yemeni blogger
- Samia Ahad, Pakistani chef
- Samia Ahmed, Egyptian synchronized swimmer
- Samia Akario, Moroccan actress and director
- Samia Amin, Egyptian actress
- Samia al-Amoudi, Saudi physician
- Samia Aouni, Tunisian footballer
- Samiya Bashir, American poet and author
- Samia Benameur, Algerian author under the pen name Maïssa Bey
- Sâmia Bomfim, Brazilian politician
- Samia Doumit, better known as Sam Doumit, American actress
- Samia Usman Fatah, Pakistani politician
- Samia Finnerty (known by the mononym Samia), American singer-songwriter
- Samia Gamal, Egyptian belly dancer and actress
- Samia Ghadie (born 1982), British actress
- Samia Ghali, French politician
- Samia Zekaria, Ethiopian diplomat
- Samia Halaby, Palestinian-American artist
- Samia Suluhu Hassan (born 1960), Tanzanian politician, president of Tanzania since 2021
- Samia Hireche, Algerian rower
- Samia Khan (born 1986), American blogger
- Sâmia Lima, Brazilian badminton player
- Samia Longchambon, English actress
- Samia Medjahdi, Algerian tennis player
- Samia Mehrez, Egyptian professor
- Samiya Mumtaz, Pakistani actress
- Samia Nkrumah (born 1960), journalist, politician and daughter of Kwame Nkrumah
- Samia Yusuf Omar, Somali sprinter
- Samiya Rafiq, Pakistani trekker
- Samia Said, Bangladeshi model and actress
- Samia Sarwar, Pakistani murder victim
- Samia Sehabi, Algerian handball player
- Samia Shoaib, Pakistani-American writer and actress
- Samia Zaman, Bangladeshi media personality

== Surname ==
- Dru Samia, American football player
- Frank Samia, Australian rugby player
- Maoz Samia, Israeli footballer
- Yom-Tov Samia, Israeli general
