= Anni Penttilä =

Finnish mountaineer (1993)

- Born: 22 April 1993 (age 33); Mikkeli, Finland
- Occupations: Mountaineer, entrepreneur, tour guide
- Known for: Summited 4 eight-thousanders, youngest Finnish woman to have summitted Everest

Anni Katri Penttilä (born 22 April 1993, Mikkeli, Finland) is a Finnish mountaineer from Helsinki, who works as a digital marketing entrepreneur and a tour guide in Tanzania and Nepal.

== Mountaineering career ==
Penttilä became interested in mountain hiking and climbing at the age of 16 in 2009, when she read an article about the Annapurna Circuit hiking trail in National Geographic. She was able to hike there in 2013. “The place was just as wonderful as I had imagined. We were at an altitude of 5.5 kilometers, with snow-covered mountains all around. I was immediately hooked.” “I was 19 years old when I set myself the goal of climbing Everest before I turn 30,” she told Retki magazine later. After an eight-year project, she reached the summit at the age of 27 as part of the Altitude Junkies group led by Phil Crampton. She became the 19th Finn and the youngest Finnish woman to have summitted Everest.

By May 2026, Penttilä has managed to climb seven eight-thousanders in Nepal and India. Her goal is to climb all 14 eight-thousanders in the future. In the summer of 2025, she planned to climb K2 in Pakistan, i.e. Godwin Austen (8 611 m), and the nearby Broad Peak (8 051 m), both of which are located in the Karakorum Range. She also has the goal of conquering the so-called seven summits as the first Finnish woman. So far, the only Finn known to have achieved this feat is Atte Miettinen.

While preparing for her climbs, Penttilä has also experienced adversity. She broke her humerus in a gym accident in March 2017. Almost at the same time, her knee required surgery. After that, Penttilä had to move around in a wheelchair, and she wondered if the dream of conquering Everest should be abandoned. However, some six months later she managed to conquer Kilimanjaro. While in the mountains, she has managed to avoid problems, apart from occasional symptoms of mountain sickness.

Penttilä has told about her experiences in the mountains as follows:

“I am so super happy in the mountains that I wouldn’t trade it for anything. The best thing about it is that you get to be so far away from everyday life and the pressures of social media in this world. It’s enough for me if I can sleep, eat and walk. If I can do this long enough, I know I can make it. Every climbing trip strengthens the feeling in me that I have to get there again.”

== Data on Penttilä’s climbs ==
Anni Penttilä — eight-thousanders
No.	Date	Mountain	Height	References
1.	24 May 2021	Mount Everest, Nepal	8 848 metres	
2.	21 September 2023	Manaslu, Nepal	8 163 metres	
3.	20 May 2024	Lhotse, Nepal	8 516 metres	
4.	6 October 2024	Cho Oyu, Nepal	8 188 metres	
5.	7 April 2025	Annapurna I, Nepal	8 091 metres	
6.	24 April 2026	Makālu, Nepal	8 462 metres	
7.	23 May 2026	Kangchenjunga, Nepal/India	8 586 metres	
8.	30 June 2026	Nanga Parbat, Pakistan	8 125 metres	

Anni Penttilä — other summits
Year	Mountain	Height	Continent	References
2014	Imja Tse (Island Peak), Nepal	6 189 metres	Asia	
2017	Kilimanjaro, Tanzania	5 895 metres	Africa	
2018	Mount Rainier, United States	4 392 metres	North America	
2018	Uranostinden, Norway	2 157 metres	Europe	
2018	Store Smørstabbtinden, Norja	2 208 metres	Europe	
2018	Mera Peak, Nepal	6 476 metres	Asia	
2018	Baruntse, Nepal	7 162 metres	Asia	
2019	Lobuche East, Nepal	6 119 metres	Asia	
2020	Kilimanjaro, Tanzania	5 895 metres	Africa	
2021	Ama Dablam, Nepal	6 812 metres	Asia	
2022	Kilimanjaro, Tanzania	5 895 metres	Africa	
2024	Lobuche East, Nepal	6 119 metres	Asia	
2025	Mera Peak, Nepal	6 476 metres	Asia	

== Other ==
Penttilä graduated from the Aalto University in 2017 with a Master of Science degree in Economics and Business Administration. She wrote her master’s thesis on trust in mountain climbing expeditions and how it reflects in the business world. She has said that it was not difficult to find people to interview for her research.
