= Samiya =

Samiya may refer to:

- Samiya (name), an alternative spelling of the name Samia
- Samiya, an ancient sea temple in the film Pokémon Ranger and the Temple of the Sea

== See also ==
- Saamiya Siddiqui, a fictional character portrayed by Rani Mukerji in the 2004 Indian film Veer-Zaara
- Samia (disambiguation)
