= Olli Miettinen =

Finnish politician

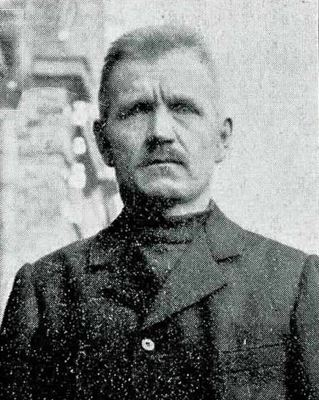
Olli Miettinen

Olli Miettinen (1 September 1869 – 28 September 1946) was a Finnish farmer and politician, born in Tuusniemi. He was a Member of the Parliament of Finland from 1910 to 1913, representing the Social Democratic Party of Finland (SDP).
