= Sami Okkonen =

Finnish football manager (born 1987)

Personal information
- Date of birth: 20 September 1987 (age 39)
- Place of birth: Finland
- Height: 1.75 m (5 ft 9 in)
- Position: Forward

Youth career
- Suurmetsän Urheilijat
- Puotinkylän Valtti

Senior career*
Years	Team	Apps	(Gls)
2008	HIFK	24	(12)
2009	Atlantis	0	(0)
2009	PK-35	4	(0)
2010–2014	HIFK	67	(17)
2014–2015	Gnistan	9	(0)
2016	Kiffen	10	(3)
2017	HIFK II	12	(8)

Managerial career
- 2018: FC Vaajakoski (youth)
- 2019: FC Vaajakoski (assistant)
- 2020–2021: FC Vaajakoski
- 2022: Jippo
- 2023: HIFK
- 2024: KäPa
- * Club domestic league appearances and goals as of 21 February 2024

Sami Okkonen (born 20 September 1987) is a Finnish football manager and a former player, who played as a forward. Okkonen completed the UEFA A -coaching license in 2022.

== Playing career ==
Okkonen started football in the youth teams of Suurmetsän Urheilijat in Suurmetsä, Helsinki, and Puotinkylän Valtti in Vartiokylä, Helsinki.

During his playing career, Okkonen played for Helsinki-based clubs HIFK, Atlantis, PK-35, Gnistan and Kiffen in second tier Ykkönen, third tier Kakkonen and fourth tier Kolmonen. In the 2014 season when playing in Ykkönen with HIFK, the club won a promotion. However, due to injury, he did not make an appearance in Veikkausliiga. He ended his playing career in 2018 with FC Vaajakoski and worked as youth coach for the club. Next season in 2019, he started as the club's assistant coach.

== Managerial career ==
Okkonen worked as the manager of FC Vaajakoski during 2020–2021 in third tier Kakkonen.

He was named the manager of fellow Kakkonen side Jippo for the 2022 season. On 11 August 2022, the club exercised their option and extended his contract until the end of 2024.

However, on 29 November 2022, Okkonen was named the manager of a newly relegated HIFK in second tier Ykkönen, the club he used to represent for several years as a player. He signed a two-year deal with the club. He terminated his contract at the end of the season, due to the club's severe financial problems, which ultimately forced HIFK to bankruptcy.

On 8 December 2023, after terminating his contract with HIFK, it was simultaneously announced that Okkonen was appointed the manager of Käpylän Pallo (KäPa), competing in the new second tier Ykkösliiga in the 2024 season. He was dismissed on 29 July 2024.

In November 2024, he started working for IF Gnistan, developing the coaching in the club.

== Personal life ==
Besides football, Okkonen has played also futsal for Liikunnan Riemu. He has studied in the Faculty of Sport and Health Sciences at the University of Jyväskylä in Jyväskylä, Finland, while working for FC Vaajakoski.

== Career statistics ==
As of 21 February 2024

Appearances and goals by club, season and competition
Club	Season	League			National cup (Note: Includes Suomen Cup)		Total	
Club	Season	Division	Apps	Goals	Apps	Goals	Apps	Goals
HIFK	2008	Kakkonen	24	12	0	0	24	12
Atlantis	2009	Ykkönen	0	0	0	0	0	0
PK-35	2009	Kakkonen	4	0	0	0	4	0
HIFK	2010	Kakkonen	25	14	0	0	25	14
HIFK	2011	Ykkönen	24	4	0	0	24	4
HIFK	2012	Ykkönen	25	9	2	2	27	11
HIFK	2013	Kakkonen	6	0	2	0	8	0
HIFK	2014	Ykkönen	12	4	0	0	12	4
HIFK	Total		92	31	4	2	96	33
IF Gnistan	2014	Kakkonen	2	0	0	0	2	0
IF Gnistan	2015	Kakkonen	7	0	0	0	7	0
IF Gnistan	Total		9	0	0	0	9	0
FC Kiffen	2016	Kakkonen	10	3	0	0	10	3
HIFK II	2017	Kolmonen	12	8	0	0	12	8
Career total			151	54	4	2	155	56

== Managerial statistics ==
As of 29 July 2024

Team	Nat	From	To	Record							
Team	Nat	From	To	P	W	D	L	GF	GA	GD	W%
FC Vaajakoski	(Finland)	1 January 2020	31 December 2021	40	18	10	12	60	51	+9	45.0
Jippo	(Finland)	1 January 2022	31 December 2022	28	18	5	5	59	25	+34	64.3
HIFK	(Finland)	1 January 2023	31 December 2023	36	16	8	12	55	49	+6	44.4
Käpylän Pallo	(Finland)	1 January 2024	29 July 2024	25	4	7	14	41	60	−19	16.0
Total				129	56	30	43	215	185	+30	

== Honours ==
As a player

=== HIFK ===
- Ykkönen: 2014
- Kakkonen, Group A: 2010
