= Garry Charles =

English author

- Born: 16 August 1973 (age 53); Bedford, Bedfordshire, England
- Occupations: author, screenwriter
- Writing career
- Period: 2005 - present
- Genres: Horror, Fantasy
- Website: www.garrycharles.co.uk

Garry Charles (born 16 August 1973) is an English award winning writer of horror and fantasy.

== Biography ==
=== Early life ===
Charles was born in Bedford on 16 August 1973. His family moved North when he was five years old, resulting in his formative years being spent in Selby, North Yorkshire. Before taking up writing he worked as a butcher, greengrocer and electrician within the coal mining industry. After working underground for thirteen years he moved on to paper mills and food production factories.

=== 2003 - 2008 ===
Charles began penning Heaven's Falling in late 2003, completing a final draft by 2005. Originally one piece, it was split into two volumes, Ascension and Redemption, for printing purposes.

This was followed up by Hammerhead, a novelization based upon the low-budget horror film, The Summer of the Massacre. It is rumoured that he was given free rein to reinvent the film, thereby making the book what the film should have been.

=== 2009 to present ===
In June 2009, Charles released his fourth novel, Death Tide, for free download on his website.

Charles released his fifth novel, Slavis, on 1 September 2010.

Charles also works outside of horror and has scripted Revenge, a Scottish thriller for director Bill Little. The City of Hell is another noir-like thriller based on the underbelly of the 1930s, produced by Julie Fernandez.

== Personal life ==
Charles currently resides in Yorkshire, England with his wife and children.

Charles counts Shaun Hutson, Clive Barker and Matthew Reilly amongst his list of literary influences.

== Bibliography ==
=== Novels ===
- Heaven's Falling: Ascension (2005)
- Heaven's Falling: Redemption (2006)
- Hammerhead: A Summer of Massacre (2007)
- Death Tide (2009)
- Slavis (September 2010)
- Tranquility (TBC)
- Shredder (TBC)

=== Short stories ===
- Midnight Itch of Uranus (2009) - short graphic novel
- It Comes With the Tide (2009)
- Ghostwriter (2009)

== Filmography ==
- Straw Man (2009) writer, executive producer
- Horrorcide (2009) short story
- The Horror Pages (2010) writer, executive producer - "A Woman Scorned" segment
- Dead Cert (2010) based on an idea by
- The Horror Vault 3 (2010) executive producer

== Awards ==
The Dead of Night Awards - Best Author (2006)
