= Sami Rafi =

Egyptian artist (1931–2019)

- Born: 8 April 1931; Cairo
- Citizenship: Egypt
- Occupations: Visual artist, Interior designer, Filmmaker

Sami Rafi (Arabic: سامي رافع) (8 April 1931–14 May 2019) was an Egyptian visual artist, interior designer and filmmaker. He is best known for his design of the Unknown Soldier Memorial in Nasr City.

== Biography ==
Rafi was born to a father from Egypt and a mother from Lebanon. He was the younger brother of the artist Samir Rafi. He studied at the Faculty of Fine Arts in Cairo and from 1962 to 1967 with a scholarship at the Academy of Fine Arts Vienna.

He worked as a stage designer at the Cairo Opera House.

He created mural works for 19 stations of the Cairo Metro. Among his creations are also book covers.

In 2021, works by Rafi were exhibited posthumously at the second Egypt International Art Fair in Cairo.
