= Sami Fatha =

Saudi Arabian footballer

Personal information
- Full name: Sami Othman Fatha
- Date of birth: March 10, 1989 (age 37)
- Place of birth: Mecca, Saudi Arabia
- Height: 1.70 m (5 ft 7 in)
- Position: Goalkeeper

Youth career
- Al-Wahda

Senior career*
Years	Team	Apps	(Gls)
2009–2016	Al-Wahda	4	(0)
2013	→ Al Rabea (loan)	12	(0)
2016	Damac		
2017–2019	Al-Jubail		
2019–2020	Al-Khaleej		
2020–2021	Al-Kawkab		
2021–2023	Al-Jubail		
- * Club domestic league appearances and goals

Sami Fatha [سامي فضة in Arabic] (born 10 March 1989) is a Saudi football goalkeeper.
