= Sami Larabi =

French footballer (born 1996)

Personal information
- Full name: Sami Larabi
- Date of birth: 13 April 1996 (age 30)
- Place of birth: Toulouse, France
- Height: 1.84 m (6 ft 0 in)
- Position: Center back

Team information
- Current team: Toulouse II

Youth career
- –2015: Toulouse

Senior career*
Years	Team	Apps	(Gls)
2015–	Toulouse	1	(0)
- * Club domestic league appearances and goals as of 21:50, 21 August 2016 (UTC)

Sami Larabi (born 13 April 1996) is a French footballer who currently plays for the reserves of Ligue 1 side Toulouse FC. He plays as a center back.

== Club career ==
Larabi is a youth exponent from Toulouse. He made his Ligue 1 debut on 17 January 2014 against SC Bastia replacing Jean-Armel Kana-Biyik after 87 minutes in a 1–1 home draw.
