= Sami Khan (disambiguation) =

Sami Khan may refer to:

== People ==
- Sami Khan (born 1980), Pakistani actor and model
- Sami Khan (child actor) (born 2008), Pakistani child actor
- Sami Khan (filmmaker), Canadian filmmaker
- Sami Khan (general), Indian Army general
