= Samia al-Aghbari =

Yemeni blogger

Samia al-Aghbari (Arabic: سامية الأغبري) is a Yemeni blogger and frequent critic of the government of Yemen and extremism. She played a prominent role in the street protests that saw President Ali Abdullah Saleh forced to abdicate power.

== Biography ==
Samia is a journalist and human rights activist in Yemen. In 2007 she wrote an article that criticised President Ali Abdullah Saleh decision to run for another term. In response a pro-government newspaper published a story accusing her of having illicit relationship with foreign men. She sued the newspaper and won. She was one of leaders of the protest against President Ali Abdullah Saleh and one of the many women who joined the protest going against the traditional gender roles of women in Yemen. She would distribute flyers against the government. She would also keep a running tally of the Human rights abuses committed by government security forces. She was the secretary of the Rights and Freedoms Committee of the Journalists' Syndicate in Yemen. On 13 February 2011 she was physically assaulted, her attackers also attempted to kidnap her. She accused police officers who were nearby of not intervening. On 12 December 2012, she said Politics, religion and tribes are an ugly combination on the 10th anniversary of the assassination of Jarallah Omar. She was soon accused of blasphemy for her comments by Islamists in Yemen. She has also spoken against the prosecution of the people of Baháʼí Faith in Yemen. She expressed despondency in the following the confusion that followed the ouster of President Saleh, feelings she said was shared by other democratic activists in Yemen. She is also a contributing writer to newspapers.
