= Sami Nasr =

Palestinian geologist

- سامي ناصر
- Born: Sami Nicolas Nasr; 4 October 1913; Jerusalem, Ottoman Empire
- Died: 17 November 1995 (aged 82); Balgowlah Heights, New South Wales, Australia
- Education: New Mexico School of Mines
- Occupation: Geologist
- Spouse: Connie Sittlington (m. 1948; died 1988)

Sami Nicolas Nasr (Arabic: سامي ناصر; 4 October 1913 – 17 November 1995) was a Palestinian geologist and company executive. He spent his early career working for the Iraq Petroleum Company (IPC), but fled the country after the 1958 Iraq Revolution and obtained citizenship in Ireland. He later settled in Australia where he was a pioneer of the local oil and gas industry.

== Early life ==
Nasr was born in Ottoman Jerusalem on 4 October 1913. His Arab parents were members of the Greek Orthodox Church of Jerusalem. He obtained a baccalaureate from Jerusalem's Collège Des Frères in 1931 and later undertook further studies at the University of London. In 1935 he moved to the United States to study geological engineering at the New Mexico School of Mines, graduating Bachelor of Science in 1938.

== Iraq ==
After graduating, Nasr returned to the Middle East as one of the few Arab geologists working with the Iraq Petroleum Company (IPC).

== Australia ==
In 1961, Nasr moved to Australia and joined the Bureau of Mineral Resources, Geology and Geophysics within the Department of National Development. The following year he joined Ampol Exploration Ltd – a subsidiary of Ampol Petroleum Ltd – as exploration manager and chief geologist. He was appointed as a director of the company in 1965, together with Harold Raggatt.

== Personal life ==
Nasr died at his home in Balgowlah Heights, New South Wales, on 17 November 1995. He endowed the Sami Nasr Institute for Advanced Materials at his Irish alma mater Trinity College, which opened in 2001.
