= Anni Daulter =

American cookbook author

Anni Daulter is a contemporary American author whose best-selling cookbooks are designed to promote healthy living, especially in relation to childbirth and children.

== Biography ==
Daulter studied at the University of Southern California, where she received a Master of Social Work degree. In 2012, she founded the Sacred Living Movement presenting pregnancy and childbirth as a spiritual experience while stressing the need to adopt a sacred approach to the events of everyday life. The movement started with Daulter's book, Sacred Pregnancy, and a single retreat in Ojai, California. It has since expanded to over a dozen live retreats and online workshops. Daulter lives in Oregon with her husband Tim and children Zoe, Bodhi, Lotus Sunshine, and River Love.

== Early career ==
Daulter's first book, Organically Raised: Conscious Cooking for Babies and Toddlers (2010) was the first in a line of healthy living books and cookbooks about organic lifestyles for families with kids. She is concerned with the state of our food and its effects on childhood obesity, emphasizing the need to prepare for the health and longevity of future generations. Other books include Ice Pop Joy, The Organic Family Cookbook, Naturally Fun Parties for Kids, and Bountiful Baby Purees. In addition, she was the founder of a natural organic baby food company, Bohemian Baby.

== Sacred Living Movement ==
Daulter's fourth book, Sacred Pregnancy (2012), led to the creation of the Sacred Living Movement. The book sets out to show how modern approached to pregnancy and childbirth can benefit from a return to former concepts of sacredness and communal spirit. It provides guidance to expectant mothers as they approach motherhood. The book covers everything from fetal development to naming ceremonies, and includes exercises, nutrition, guides to female spirituality, and journaling spaces. Women are encouraged to focus in on their personal experience, not just on those of their baby. She reminds women they command natural power and strength, commenting, "In the moment of birthing a baby, she is the most powerful woman in the world." The Sacred Living Movement uses retreats, rituals, meditation, reflection, and the communal sharing of experiences to help women through their pregnancies and births. Daulter believes pregnancy and birth can benefit from experiences passed down from mother to mother.

Although not embracing a new religion, Daulter's rituals borrow from Buddhism, Hinduism, Neopaganism, and New Age ideas. The movement is popular among people of childbearing age, who feel disenfranchised by traditional religions, but still seek a spiritual approach. Thelologian Ann W. Duncan states that the movement is not an isolated event, but rather an indication of a shifting culture surrounding the intersection of faith, feminism, and motherhood. The Sacred Living Movement encourages people to find spirituality in their evolving lives.

== Additional information ==
Daulter is a professional chef and eco-food and lifestyle stylist, and has styled several books, including her own, under the company Delicious Gratitude. She is a spokesperson for Nordic Naturals, has been a guest speaker at Baby Celebration, The Pump Station, Whole Children Whole planet, among others, and has written for Delicious Living Magazine and Momfilter and is consulted more widely as an expert on baby and toddler. Her book, The Organic Family Cookbook, was a Forward Indies Book Award finalist.

== Selected works ==
The following are among Anni Daulter's publications:

- Daulter, Anni; Lanay, Shante (2010). Organically Raised: Conscious Cooking for Babies and Toddlers. Penguin. ISBN 9781605296432.
- Daulter, Anni (2011). Ice Pop Joy: Organic, Healthy, Fresh, Delicious. Sellers Pub. ISBN 978-1-4162-0625-5.
- Daulter, Anni (2011). The Organic Family Cookbook: Growing, Greening, and Cooking Together. Sellers Publishing, Incorporated. ISBN 978-1-4162-0638-5.
- Daulter, Annie; Fontenot, Heather (2012). Naturally Fun Parties for Kids: Creating Handmade, Earth-Friendly Celebrations for All Seasons and Occasions. Sellers Publishing, Incorporated. ISBN 978-1-4162-0656-9.
- Daulter, Anni (2012). Sacred Pregnancy: A Loving Guide and Journal for Expectant Moms. North Atlantic Books. ISBN 978-1-58394-444-8.
- Daulter, Anni (2012). Bountiful Baby Purees. Fair Winds Press. ISBN 9781592335169.
- Daulter, Anni; Dewart, Niki (2016). Sacred Motherhood: An Inspirational Guide and Journal for Mindfully Mothering Children of All Ages. North Atlantic Books. ISBN 978-1-62317-005-9.
- Daulter, Anni (2017). Bites on a Board. Gibbs Smith. ISBN 978-1-4236-4574-0.
- Daulter, Anni; Booth, Jessica; Smithson, Jessica (2017). Sacred Medicine Cupboard. North Atlantic Books. ISBN 978-1-62317-068-4.
- Daulter, Anni; Daulter, Tim (2017). Sacred Relationship: Heart Work for Couples. North Atlantic Books. ISBN 978-1-62317-120-9.
- Daulter, Anni (2018). Flatbread: Toppings, Dips, and Drizzles. Gibbs Smith. ISBN 978-1-4236-4856-7.
