= Giorgio Vizzardelli =

Italian serial killer

- Born: Giorgio William Vizzardelli; 23 August 1922; Francavilla al Mare, Italy
- Died: 11 August 1973 (aged 50); Carrara, Italy
- Cause of death: Suicide
- Conviction: Murder
- Penalty: Life imprisonment

Details
- Victims: 5
- Span of crimes: 1937–1939
- Country: Italy
- State: Sarzana
- Date apprehended: 1940

Giorgio William Vizzardelli (23 August 1922 – 11 August 1973) was an Italian serial killer.

== Biography ==
He was born in Francavilla al Mare on 23 August 1922, the son of the director of Sarzana register, he committed his first murders at age 14, killing the rector with a gun and, in his escape, the guard of the school he attended. He returned home and behaved normally, as if nothing had happened. The investigations led to the arrest of a young man, who was acquitted after eighteen months of detention and compensated by Benito Mussolini himself.

The discovery of another two bodies, which occurred on 20 August 1938, re-opened the investigation on the murderer, who was identified after he committed his fifth murder, which took place on 29 December against the custodian of the registry office Giuseppe Bernardini.

Embedded thanks to some clues (including a denouncement report presented by his father and a key to a blood-soaked safe), Vizzardelli was arrested and sentenced to life imprisonment on 23 September 1940, avoiding the death penalty because he was a minor.

In 1944 the newspapers reported the news of his daring escape and enlistment in the Black Brigades, with a lot of capturing and killing at the hands of partisans on Monte Antola.

In prison he studied several languages to translate several literary works, until 29 July 1968, when he was granted parole for five years. Settled in his sister's house in Carrara, a few days after he finished serving his sentence, he killed himself by slitting his throat with a kitchen knife. He died on 11 August 1973.

== Victims ==
Name	Date of death
Umberto Bernardelli	4 January 1937
Andrea Bruno	4 January 1937
Livio Delfini	1938
Bruno Veneziani	1938
Giuseppe Bernardini	29 December 1938

== See also ==
- Serial killer
- Leonarda Cianciulli
- List of serial killers by country

== Bibliography ==
- Fausto Bassini, Il mostro di Sarzana 80 anni dopo, "Il Giornale", April 14, 2013
