= Tatu Miettinen =

Finnish ice hockey centre

- Born: September 4, 1979 (age 45); Kuopio, Finland
- Height: 6 ft 2 in (188 cm)
- Weight: 185 lb (84 kg; 13 st 3 lb)
- Position: Centre
- Shot: Left
- Played for: HPK; KalPa
- Playing career: 1999–2014

Tatu Miettinen (born September 4, 1979) is a Finnish former professional ice hockey centre who played seventeen games in the SM-liiga for HPK and KalPa. He is the younger brother of Tommi Miettinen.

Miettinen began his career with KalPa, playing in their junior teams as well as in Suomi-sarja and Mestis, between 1994 and 2002. He joined HPK for the 2002–03 SM-liiga season and played seven games for the team, scoring two assists before returning to Kalpa. He returned to the SM-liiga with KalPa after their promotion in 2005, playing in ten games and again registering two assists.

== Career statistics ==
			Regular season					Playoffs
Season	Team	League	GP	G	A	Pts	PIM	GP	G	A	Pts	PIM
1994–95	KalPa U16	U16 SM-sarja	31	4	16	20	54	—	—	—	—	—
1995–96	KalPa U18	U18 SM-sarja	32	2	7	9	40	—	—	—	—	—
1996–97	KalPa U18	U18 SM-sarja	35	6	6	12	26	5	2	0	2	12
1996–97	KalPa U20	U20 SM-liiga	1	0	0	0	0	—	—	—	—	—
1997–98	KalPa U20	U20 U-divisioona	13	2	4	6	12	14	2	5	7	14
1998–99	KalPa U20	U20 SM-liiga	22	4	9	13	12	—	—	—	—	—
1999–00	KalPa U20	U20 SM-liiga	19	6	20	26	48	—	—	—	—	—
1999–00	KalPa	Suomi-sarja	3	2	0	2	0	—	—	—	—	—
1999–00	Diskos	I-Divisioona	26	0	3	3	14	6	0	0	0	0
2000–01	KalPa	Suomi-sarja	34	16	29	45	42	4	4	7	11	2
2001–02	KalPa	Mestis	40	13	20	33	32	9	1	3	4	4
2002–03	HPK	SM-liiga	7	0	2	2	2	—	—	—	—	—
2002–03	KalPa	Mestis	29	1	8	9	24	4	0	0	0	2
2003–04	KalPa	Mestis	45	5	12	17	26	11	1	4	5	2
2004–05	KalPa	Mestis	44	1	14	15	32	—	—	—	—	—
2005–06	KalPa	SM-liiga	10	0	2	2	4	—	—	—	—	—
2005–06	Iisalmen Peli-Karhut	2. Divisioona	1	1	0	1	2	—	—	—	—	—
2005–06	Hokki	Mestis	1	0	0	0	2	—	—	—	—	—
2005–06	Jokipojat	Mestis	5	1	1	2	4	—	—	—	—	—
2006–07	Jokipojat	Mestis	44	7	12	19	50	3	0	1	1	6
2007–08	KooKoo	Mestis	45	4	21	25	36	8	0	5	5	6
2009–10	KooKoo	Mestis	26	1	7	8	26	—	—	—	—	—
2009–10	Jukurit	Mestis	8	3	0	3	8	4	1	0	1	0
2010–11	Jokipojat	Mestis	47	3	7	10	45	—	—	—	—	—
2011–12	Kajastus	2. Divisioona	20	11	20	31	49	—	—	—	—	—
2012–13	Kajastus	2. Divisioona	23	13	32	45	18	—	—	—	—	—
2013–14	Kajastus	2. Divisioona	32	7	28	35	46	—	—	—	—	—
SM-liiga totals			17	0	4	4	6	—	—	—	—	—
Mestis totals			334	39	102	141	285	39	3	13	16	20
