= 1973 South Vietnamese Senate election =

South Vietnamese election

Senate elections were held in South Vietnam on 26 August 1973. The election was contested by a total of four lists, of which two would be elected and receive 15 seats each. Each voter had two votes. Voter turnout was reported to be 92.7%.

== Results ==
Party	Votes	%	Seats
Four lists			30
Total			30
Total votes	6,544,645	–	
Registered voters/turnout	7,060,027	92.70	
Source: Nohlen et al.
