= Anni Lanz =

Swiss human rights activist (born 1945)

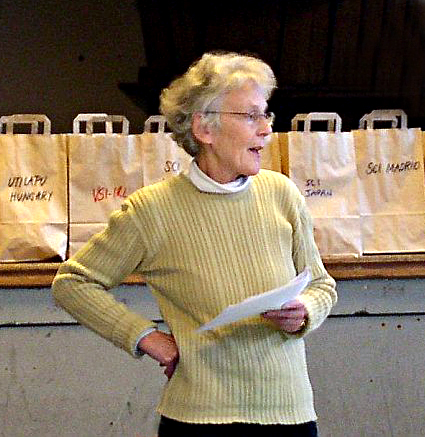
- Lanz in 2005
- Born: 1945 (age 79–80)
- Occupation: activist

Anni Lanz (born 1945) is a Swiss human rights activist with a focus on Switzerland's refugee policy. Today she is active in the refugee aid organization Solidarité sans frontières.

== Life ==
Anni Lanz studied at the Kunstgewerbeschule Basel. She later studied sociology at the universities of Zurich and Basel.

On December 19, 2018, Anni Lanz was sentenced for incitement to illegal entry, exit or residence by the District Court Brig to a fine of 800 francs or five days in prison. The sentence is still being appealed. She sees herself as an escape helper.

== Awards ==
In 2004, Anni Lanz received an honorary doctorate from the Faculty of Law of the University of Basel. "The Faculty of Law thus honors Anni Lanz's tireless commitment to the implementation of human rights at national and international level, especially in the area of asylum law and women's rights. The laudation states that in her professional and voluntary work, Ms. Lanz consistently puts the law at the service of real people and, in addition to her lobbying work, also provides concrete help at all times."

Her commitment was also recognized when she was nominated as one of five Swiss women in the 1000 Women for the Nobel Peace Prize 2005 project.

In 2007, Anni Lanz received the Fischhof Prize, which is awarded by the Foundation against Racism and Anti-Semitism (GRA) and the Society for Minorities in Switzerland (GMS).

In 2022, Anni Lanz received the Prix Courage Lifetime Award with the justification: "For almost 40 years, Anni Lanz has been fighting for people on the run."
