= Sami Saeed Al Ahmed =

Sami Saeed al-Ahmad (Arabic: سامي سعيد الاحمد) (1930–2006) was an Iraqi historian in Ancient history of the Middle East. He was born in 1930 in Hillah Iraq, where he had received primary and secondary education. In 1953 received a bachelor's degree in history from the University of Baghdad, then he received a master's degree from the University of Chicago in 1957 and doctorate from the University of Michigan in 1962. he was appointed professor at the University of Denver in Colorado in America in 1963 -1967. He returned to Iraq in the late 1960s and was appointed professor at Baghdad University, has more than thirty books printed in Arabic and English, including the south of Iraq in time of the UNESCO King Banipal (commonly known as Assure-bani-pal), Yazidis, and the history of the Persian Gulf in the oldest times, the island languages.

Invited by the University of Michigan he has been Professor of Ancient History since the late nineties.

Sami Alahmed married Nancy Beth Tritsch, near Chicago, Illinois, in 1957 and to this union were born two children, S. Anthony Ahmed and Emily Ahmed. Though the marriage ended in divorce, Sami and Nancy remained lifelong friends. Sami got married in 1964 in Denver, Colorado to Ibtihaj Omer Taher (1945–2008) and to this union was born a son, Marwan Ahmed, and daughter, Dina Jabra. All of his kids live in the United States of America except Marwan who preferred to stay in the home country (Iraq).

Sami Al Ahmed had a stroke and died several days later on March 6, 2006.

== Works ==
- Aḥmad, Sāmī Saʻīd. Ḥaḍārāt al-waṭan al-ʻArabī al-qadīmah asāsān lil-ḥaḍārah al-Yūnānīyah / 2002 Book 1
- Aḥmad, Sāmī Saʻīd. Samīrāmīs / 1989 Book 2
- Aḥmad, Sāmī Saʻīd. Tārīkh al-Khalīj al-ʻArabī min aqdam al-azminah ḥattá al-taḥrīr al-ʻArabī / 1985 Book 3
- Gilgamesh. Arabic & Akkadian. Malḥamat Gilgāmish / 1984 Book 4
- Aḥmad, Sāmī Saʻīd. al-Madkhal ilá tārīkh al-ʻālam al-qadīm / 1983 Book 5
- Aḥmad, Sāmī Saʻīd. al-Madkhal ilá dirāsat tārīkh al-lughāt al-Jazarīyah / 1981 Book 6
- Aḥmad, Sāmī Saʻīd. Ḥaḍārāt al-waṭan al-ʻArabī ka-khalfīyah lil-madanīyah al-Yūnānīyah / 1980 Book 7
- Lloyd, Seton. Āthār bilād al-Rāfidayn min al-ʻaṣr al-ḥajarī al-qadīm ḥattá al-iḥtilāl al-Fār 1980 Book 8
- Aḥmad, Sāmī Saʻīd. Tārīkh Filasṭīn al-qadīm / 1979 Book 9
- Aḥmad, Sāmī Saʻīd. al-Sūmirīyūn wa-turāthuhum al-ḥaḍārī / 1975 Book 10
- Aḥmad, Sāmī Saʻīd. al-Yazīdīyah: aḥwāluhum wa-muʻtaqadātuhum / 1975 Book 11
- Aḥmad, Sāmī Saʻīd. al-Ālih Zūwus : muqaddimah fī dirāsat al-iʻtiqād bi-Zūwus ḥattá iḍmiḥlāl Rūmā / 1970 Book 12
