= Tommi Miettinen =

Finnish ice hockey player (born 1975)

- Born: December 3, 1975 (age 50) Kuopio, Finland
- Height: 6 ft 0 in (183 cm)
- Weight: 187 lb (85 kg; 13 st 5 lb)
- Position: Centre
- Shot: Left
- Played for: KalPa; TPS; Ilves; Brynäs IF; SC Langnau; Luleå HF
- NHL draft: 236th overall, 1994; Mighty Ducks of Anaheim
- Playing career: 1993–2013

Tommi Miettinen (born December 3, 1975) is a retired Finnish professional ice hockey player and current head coach for HC TPS, the Finnish club he played for until he ended his playing career in 2013.

Miettinen was drafted 236th overall by the Mighty Ducks of Anaheim in the 1994 NHL entry draft. He is the older brother of Tatu Miettinen.

== Career statistics ==
			Regular season					Playoffs
Season	Team	League	GP	G	A	Pts	PIM	GP	G	A	Pts	PIM
1990–91	KalPa U20	Jr. A SM-sarja	4	0	0	0	2	—	—	—	—	—
1991–92	KalPa U20	Jr. A SM-sarja	23	4	8	12	8	—	—	—	—	—
1992–93	KalPa U18	U18 SM-sarja	7	3	8	11	2	—	—	—	—	—
1992–93	KalPa U20	U20 I-divisioona	12	9	12	21	6	14	7	15	22	8
1992–93	KalPa	SM-liiga	14	0	0	0	0	—	—	—	—	—
1993–94	KalPa U20	U20 I-divisioona	1	1	2	3	2	8	4	7	11	8
1993–94	KalPa	SM-liiga	47	5	7	12	14	—	—	—	—	—
1994–95	KalPa U20	U20 SM-liiga	2	1	3	4	2	—	—	—	—	—
1994–95	KalPa	SM-liiga	48	13	16	29	26	3	1	1	2	2
1995–96	HC TPS	SM-liiga	36	3	10	13	10	10	2	1	3	29
1996–97	HC TPS	SM-liiga	46	6	15	21	6	12	3	4	7	8
1997–98	HC TPS	SM-liiga	42	8	6	14	26	4	0	0	0	0
1998–99	HC TPS	SM-liiga	54	10	17	27	26	10	4	4	8	0
1999–00	Ilves	SM-liiga	54	13	20	33	34	—	—	—	—	—
2000–01	Ilves	SM-liiga	55	10	20	30	38	9	0	1	1	4
2001–02	Ilves	SM-liiga	55	11	31	42	36	3	0	0	0	2
2002–03	Brynäs IF	Elitserien	50	9	17	26	76	10	4	8	12	4
2003–04	Brynäs IF	Elitserien	50	13	21	34	56	—	—	—	—	—
2004–05	Brynäs IF	Elitserien	47	7	17	24	46	10	2	5	7	6
2005–06	Brynäs IF	Elitserien	19	4	3	7	12	—	—	—	—	—
2005–06	SC Langnau	NLA	21	3	7	10	55	—	—	—	—	—
2006–07	SC Langnau	NLA	44	9	24	33	93	—	—	—	—	—
2007–08	Luleå HF	Elitserien	46	9	19	28	80	—	—	—	—	—
2008–09	Luleå HF	Elitserien	37	6	17	23	36	5	0	0	0	2
2009–10	KalPa	SM-liiga	58	11	30	41	44	13	4	5	9	8
2010–11	KalPa	SM-liiga	57	6	20	26	52	5	0	1	1	6
2011–12	KalPa	SM-liiga	57	4	16	20	46	7	2	2	4	6
2012–13	KalPa	SM-liiga	60	9	15	24	50	5	1	0	1	8
SM-liiga totals			683	109	223	332	398	81	17	19	36	73
Elitserien totals			249	48	94	142	306	25	6	13	19	12
