= Anni Becker =

German musician (1926–2009)

Anni Becker (1926 in Kaiserslautern – 22 June 2009) was a German musician, writer, poet, and performer of popular and folk songs. She was a teacher by profession, and taught actively until 1991.

== Early life ==
Becker was born in 1926 to Jakob and Magdalena Moessel in Kaiserslautern, Germany. As a child, she sang frequently in choir groups and churches in the area. At the age of 20, she graduated from a women's school in Kaiserslautern, and moved to the Suedwestfunk studio to work the following autumn. While working at the studio, she also studied at the Pedagogical Academy in Kirchheimbolanden, and completed the Staatsexamen for German language, arts, and religion in 1952. She married Hans Becker the same year, with whom she would raise four children.

== Music ==
Becker's songs take inspiration from Palatinate folk music tradition and the German cabaret. Many of her songs are sung in the Palatine (Note: German: Pfälzisch) dialect, which was spoken in her hometown and played a dominant role in her identity. Her early musical endeavors consisted mostly of setting traditional Palatine poems to song—for example, the writings of Liesel Ott.

Becker formed a musical-literary cabaret with fellow musicians Michael Bauer and Gerd Forster in the late '60s and early '70s, in keeping with her passion for literature and song. She and her performance group quickly gained recognition in Kaiserslautern and beyond. For several years, she performed with her son Jocken Becker, until he was killed in an auto accident in 1985.

== Awards and accomplishments ==
Anni Becker has received a number of awards for her music and life's work, including but not limited to: (Note: Titles roughly translated from original German.)

- The Environmental Song Prize of Ludwigshafen (1973)
- The Nürnberger Bard's Prize (1976 & 1977)
- The Bockenheimer Emichsburg Prize (1986)
- The Palatinate Medal of Honor (1998)
- Ehrenmedaille des Bezirksverbandes Pfalz (1998)
- Medal of Merit of the Federal Republic of Germany (2000)

Becker published 11 song books and released several records. Becker's songs frequently contain or allude to contemporary political and social content. In particular, her music incorporates themes of equal rights for women and environment.
