= Samia Usman Fatah =

Pakistani politician

Samia Usman Fatah (born 28 July 1940) is a former politician from Pakistan. In 1973, she became the first woman to be elected to the country's Upper House, the Senate.

== Background ==
Fatah comes from Gujrat and was born into a middle-class family. She completed her schooling in English-medium schools. Her late husband was Sheikh Usman Fateh.

== Career ==
Fatah and her husband were both founding members of the Pakistan People's Party (PPP). Her husband, however left the party in 1972. In 1968, she was appointed President of PPP's Women's Wing for the District of Gujrat.

=== Senate of Pakistan ===
A PPP candidate, Fatah was elected on a general seat in 1973. This made her the country's first woman senator and the only one during her tenure. Taking the oath on 6 August 1973, she served one term between August 1973 and August 1975. During her tenure, she served on the Committee on Finance, Planning and Development of the Economic Affairs and Statistical Division.

=== National Assembly of Pakistan ===
Again on the PPP ticket, Fatah was elected to the National Assembly of Pakistan on a special seat in 1977.

=== Foreign visits ===
In February 1975, Fatah was part of Prime Minister, Zulfikhar Ali Bhutto's entourage on his official visit to the USA.

=== Political activism ===
She organised protests and demonstrated against the military dictatorship of Zia-ul-Haq in 1977.
