= Sami Miettinen =

Finnish writer

- Born: 10 July 1970 (age 56); Lahti, Finland
- Occupation: Author
- Writing career
- Genre: Non-fiction

Sami Miettinen (born 10 July 1970) is a Finnish author of Non-fiction.

He published Neuvotteluvalta in March 2008. The negotiation theory developed in the book was immediately used by the main Finnish broadsheet newspaper Helsingin Sanomat to rank the leading Finnish politicians. The book has not been translated into English. However, Miettinen publishes an English language blog about teaching negotiation skills and related issues.

== Bibliography ==
=== Non-fiction ===
- The Future of the Euro – The Options for Finland (2014, Libera)
- Neuvotteluvalta (2008, WSOY)
