= Atte Miettinen =

Finnish mountaineer

- Born: 19 November 1975 (age 50)
- Occupations: Business executive, mountaineer
- Known for: Summited the Seven summits and five of the Volcanic Seven Summits

Atte Saku Juhani Miettinen (born November 19, 1975) is a Finnish business executive and mountaineer living in Dubai.

Miettinen was the first Finn to scale the so-called Seven summits, climbing the last of the seven on June 22, 2012. He has climbed both the Bass and Messner lists, which only 100 mountaineers in the world had done at the time. Richard Bass and Reinhold Messner’s lists differ for the highest peaks in Oceania.

During his Seven Peaks project, Miettinen became only the second Finn to reach the summit of Vinson Massif in Antarctica. The first Finnish conqueror of the mountain was Veikka Gustafsson. Miettinen was the first Finn to climb Carstensz Pyramid in Indonesia.

Miettinen has also climbed five of the Volcanic Seven Summits.

Atte Miettinen — Seven Summits — Volcanic Seven Summits
Date	Mountain	Height	Continent	References
January 2007	Kilimanjaro, Tanzania	5 895 metres	Africa	
July 2008	Mont Blanc, France; Italy	5 805 metres	Western Europe	
July 2009	Elbrus, Russia	5 642 metres	Europe	
April 2010	Mount Kosciuszko, Australia	2 228 metres	Oceania	
May 2011	Carstensz Pyramid, Indonesia	4 884 metres	Oceania	
November 2011	Vinson Massif, Antarctica	4 892 metres	Antarctica	
December 2011	Aconcagua, Argentina	6 961 metres	South America	
May 2012	Mount Everest, Nepal	8 848,86 metres	Asia	
June 2012	Denali, United States	6 190 metres	North America	
December 2019	Ojos del Salado, Chile	6 893 metres	South America	
November 2022	Pico de Orizaba, Mexico	5 636 metres	North America	
September 2024	Mount Damavand, Iran	5 610 metres	Asia	
