= Charles Brenton Fisk =

American organ builder (1925–1983)

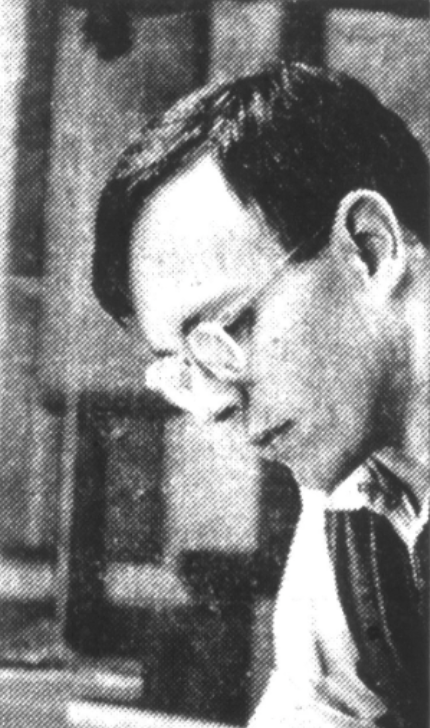
- Fisk in 1964
- Born: February 7, 1925; Washington, D.C., US
- Died: December 16, 1983 (aged 58); Boston, Massachusetts, US
- Occupation: Organ builder
- Years active: 33
- Known for: Building historical organs
- Movement: Organ Reform Movement
- Relatives: Joyce C. Stearns (uncle)

Charles Brenton Fisk (February 7, 1925 – December 16, 1983) was an American pipe organ builder who was one of the first to reintroduce mechanical tracker actions in modern organ building over electro-pneumatic actions.

Born in Washington D. C., he developed an early fascination with organs and electronics. After graduating high school, he was drafted into World War II as a technician. He was later transferred to Los Alamos Laboratory, where he unknowingly contributed to the Manhattan Project and subsequently the atomic bomb Fat Man. Afterwards, Fisk initially pursued a career in atomic physics, earning a degree from Harvard University. However, he soon decided to abandon physics and dedicate himself to organbuilding.

He took apprenticeship under John Swinford and Walter Holtkamp and made frequent trips to Europe to study European organs. Often associated with the Organ Reform Movement, he often incorporated historical features into his organs. Afterward he became a partner of the Andover Organ Company, which he renamed to C.B. Fisk, Inc. after the departure of its owner, Thomas A. Byrk. Under Fisk, the firm produced many significant organs, such as those at Memorial Church of Harvard, Old West Church in Boston, and King's Chapel on Tremont Street. The firm continues to manufacture organs today.

== Life and career ==
=== Early life ===
Fisk was born in Washington, DC, United States, on February 7, 1925, to Brenton Kern Fisk, a lawyer, and Amelia Worthington Fisk, a social worker and suffragette. In the early 1930s, the Fisk family moved to the city of Cambridge, Massachusetts. As a soprano, he joined the choir of the Christ Church of the Cambridge Common, at which E. Power Biggs was the choirmaster and organist. At this point in life, Fisk reflected that his interest in organs had not matured yet, describing organs as simple "moaning in the background". In addition to singing, he played trumpets and organs.

On Fisk's 13th birthday, he was gifted a reed organ, on which he made minor repairs. According to one of Fisk's friends, Fisk fiddled with electromechanical devices and built his own amplifiers when he was 14 years old. After playing his sister's Bach recordings on his amplifiers, he started to develop a fondness for the sound of organs. He was well-versed in creating tube amplifiers, and acquaintances of Fisk's parents often asked for him to make one for them.

Fisk studied at The Cambridge School of Weston from 1938, and graduated in 1942. In 1943, at age 17, he secured a job in the University of Chicago's Metallurgical Laboratory with the help of his physicist uncle, Joyce Stearns, who also worked there. Stearns had suggested to Fisk's parents that Fisk work with him to avoid being conscripted into the battlefields of World War II.

=== Military service ===
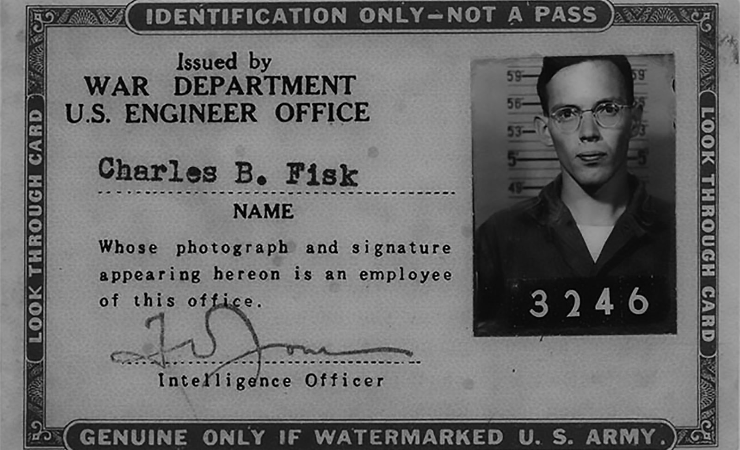
Fisk's US army ID from 1945

Soon after graduating high school, Fisk was drafted to Army Air Corps, where he worked as a Link Trainer mechanic. A year later, he was transferred to the Los Alamos Laboratory in July 1944.

While at Los Alamos, Fisk was assigned as an electronics technician and a lab helper in the Bomb Physics division. He worked under Darol Froman with twenty other people. As a member of the 9812th Special Engineer Detachment, Fisk was part of a unit that collected knowledgeable people to conduct research.

His job included soldering pre-amps for electronic sensors. These sensors were used for detecting the presence of a spherical implosion during bomb testing, which is needed for plutonium bombs to function. Those designs were eventually implemented into the Fat Man atomic bomb, which was dropped onto Nagasaki in 1945. It can be said Fisk worked as a part of the Manhattan Project, but he was unaware of his involvement until some weeks before the bomb was dropped.

The work I am doing means nothing to me. That is, I don't understand what the object of it is. Of course, the principle of the whole thing is secrecy, and I am just as much in the dark about the project as you are. My official status is 'Lab helper in the Metallurgical Lab of the University of Chicago.' Metallurgy and the University of Chicago have about as much to do with the project as a baby elephant.

— Charles Fisk, letter to his parents in February 1943

=== Education and career change ===
After the conclusion of the war, Fisk studied at Harvard University. Continuing his interest in music, he joined a glee club at the university's Memorial Church. He graduated from Harvard with an undergraduate degree in physics in 1949. After graduating, Fisk desired to stay in New Mexico and was offered a position as an assistant in Los Alamos. However, due to his father's declining health and his commitment to his would-be future spouse Ann Lindenmuth, he rejected the offer. For a year and a half, Fisk studied cosmic rays at the Brookhaven National Laboratory. From 1950 to 1951, he lived in California and attended Stanford University, intending on receiving a PhD in physics. At Stanford, Fisk also studied under the American organist Herbert Nanney and became an apprentice of the organ builder John Swinford. He left Stanford's physics curriculum after only completing one six-week semester, and ended up switching to a music curriculum.

The Boston Globe and The Diapason attributed Fisk's decision to leave physics to the unease he felt for contributing to the bombings of Hiroshima and Nagasaki. However, The Georgia Review argues this is an oversimplification. In a letter Fisk sent to his parents on August 12, 1945, he wrote:

With only two bombs we have killed between 250,000 and 300,000 Japanese people. Divided evenly over the number of people on the project, each member is responsible for the death of four Japanese. I cannot count this as an honor.

and

As for myself, I see no reason why you should not tell people of my association with this project. Despite all the foregoing, there has been introduced into our lives an element of pride, the pride that accompanies the success of a mission. I think I can look a combat soldier in the eye now. If you feel like being a little proud too, that's OK. But bear in mind that this is not basically something to be proud of, and if you feel like offering a prayer for the human race, now is a good time.

In October 1950, Fisk wrote to his parents that he was switching to a career in music. Fisk continued working part-time as an apprentice under John Swinford in Redwood City, California, while studying under music professors Putnam Aldrich and George Houle. One of Fisk's earliest experiences with organs came when he assisted Swinford in building the organ for Santa Barbara's Trinity Episcopal Church. Fellow organbuilder Walter Holtkamp offered Fisk a position in 1952, and in 1954, Fisk, at Swinford's urging, became his apprentice in Cleveland, Ohio. Fisk learned various aspects of shop technique under Holtkamp, which was something that his apprenticeship with Swinford had lacked. His work with Holtkamp included installing the organ of St. John's Chapel of the Episcopal Theological School in 1956. Eventually, he dropped out of his music degree program to focus on organ building.

In a later interview by Keith Yocum, Fisk, aged 54, commented:

I don't know enough about Hiroshima and Nagasaki to know what was lost there, culturally, but I know what was lost in some of the big cities in Europe, which seems much more tragic to me right now. For instance, I can't get over what an incredible tragedy existed in one particular place: Katharinenkirche—St. Catherine's Church—in Hamburg, where there was an organ that Bach played, that was just perfect. ... The joys that could have come out of that one particular instrument were such that. ... I just think of what was lost.

=== C.B. Fisk, Inc. ===
In 1955, Fisk returned to Pigeon Cove, Massachusetts near his family's summer home. That same year, he became a partner in the Andover Organ Company in Methuen, Massachusetts, a firm founded in 1948 by Thomas W. Byers. Like Fisk, Byers was an organ builder who preferred manual organs over electric ones. In 1958, Fisk bought out Byers' ownership interest and became sole owner of the firm.

In 1960, Fisk changed the firm's name to C.B. Fisk, Inc. He was the firm's president and tonal designer, responsible for voicing the pipes. In 1961, the firm relocated to more spacious premises at 105 Maplewood Avenue, Gloucester, Massachusetts a former factory that once manufactured rope and fishing nets. Some employees chose to remain in Methuen and established a new company under the original name, the Andover Organ Company. After Fisk's death, C. B. Fisk, Inc. became an employee-owned company, and continues to manufacture organs to the present day. It is now located at 21 Kondelin Road.

C. B. Fisk, Inc. and Andover Organ Company employed notable organists Barbara Owen, Fritz Noack, and John Brombaugh. Some of these organists have moved on from C. B. Fisk and created their own organ-building companies, with Noack establishing the Noack Organ Company and Brombaugh establishing John Brombaugh & Associates. The 46th mayor of Gloucester, Joseph F. Grace, was also an employee.

=== Membership ===
Fisk was a member of the American Pipe Organ Association, the International Society of Organ Builders, the American Institute of Organ Builders, the Organ Historical Society, and the American Guild of Organists.

=== Marriages ===
Fisk married Ann Warren Lindenmuth in 1950, with whom he had a son and a daughter.

His second marriage was to Virginia Lee Crist, who was from Gloucester. He and Crist married at Rockport, Massachusetts. They had two daughters and a son.

=== Death ===
Fisk died on December 16, 1983, aged 58 years, due to a liver autoimmune condition, at Philips House, Massachusetts General Hospital. Fisk had lived with sclerosing cholangitis for nearly three decades, but it was only diagnosed a few years before his death. Fisk's funeral was held on December 20, 1983, at St. John's Episcopal Church, Gloucester. A memorial service was held in the Memorial Church of Harvard University on January 21, 1984. Dedicated organ performances were made throughout January.

== Fisk Organs ==
=== Organ building ===
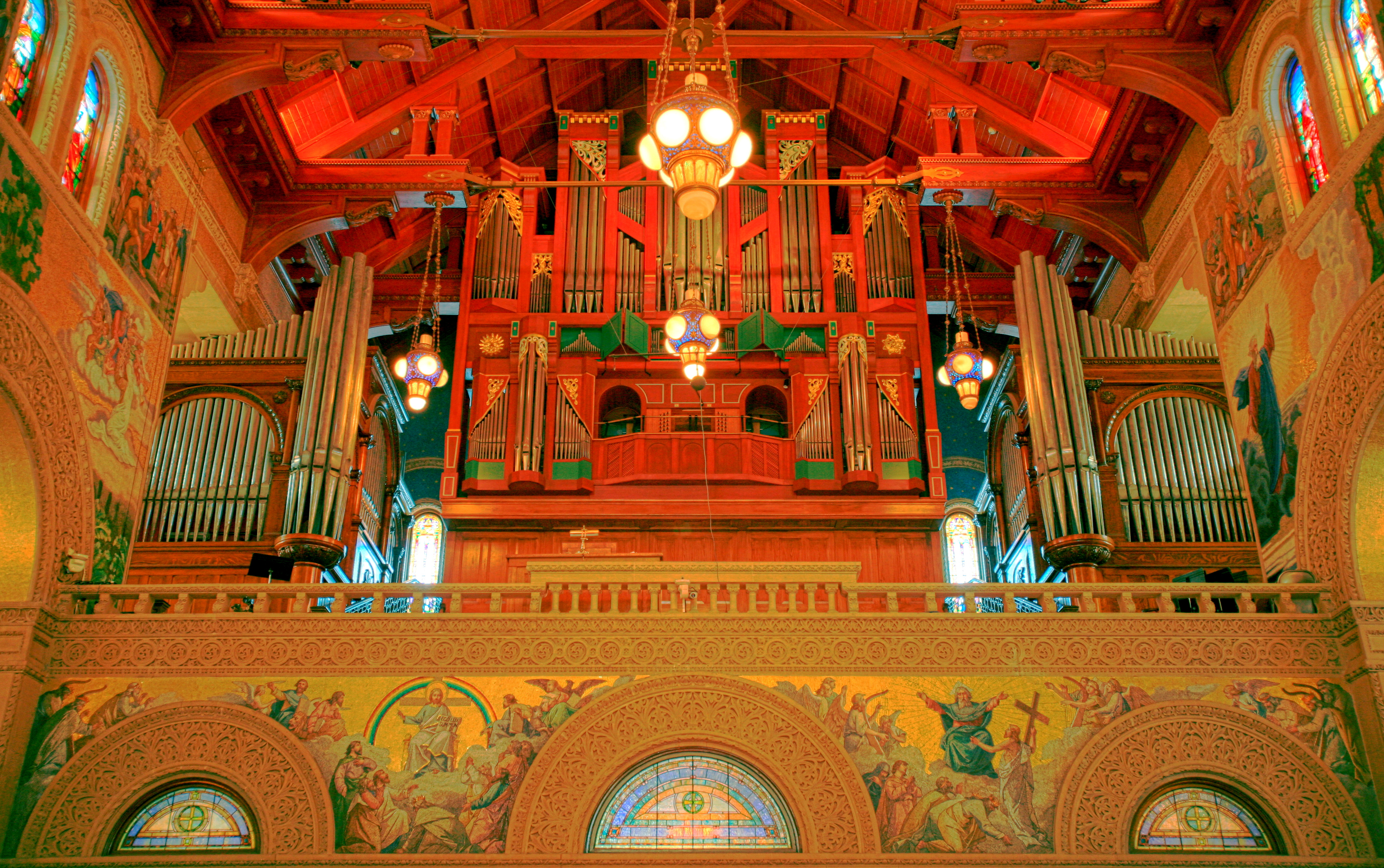
1984 Fisk-Nanney organ in the Stanford Memorial Church (op. 85)

Robert Huw Morgan plays Bach's Fantasia and Fugue in G minor on the Fisk-Nanney organ at the Stanford Memorial Church in Stanford, California.

In contrast to the tracker-action organs of the baroque period, the use of electro-pneumatic action mechanisms was the mainstream practice in early 20th-century organ building. Fisk was among the first builders to break with this practice: he adopted the tracker action and stop-action mechanisms of historical European and American organs, making him one of the first modern American organ builders to do so. The revitalization of tracker action was a part of the Organ Reform Movement, of which Fisk was cited as a major participant by The American Organist.

In tracker-action organs, the movement of the keys or pedals is mechanically linked to the valves, enabling air to flow through the organ pipes. In electro-pneumatic action, valves and keys are connected electrically, without the use of mechanical trackers. An organ manual is a set of keys that are played with the hands, similar to the keyboard on a piano. However, unlike a piano, an organ can have multiple manuals, which are arranged in tiers.

To further his understanding of traditional organs, Fisk studied features of historical European organs. Trips to Europe were common, with the first one being in 1959, where he traveled with Arthur Howes. Fisk was particularly interested in the organ located in the Jakobikirche church, and he made three journeys to Germany to study the organ. He then tried to emulate them in his own designs.

In addition to building new organs, Fisk restored various historical organs. Barbara Owen, a former collaborator, wrote that his works were influenced by German and French organs. His organs were described as having an eclectic nature, as he never stuck to a singular style of organ building.

=== Opus numbers ===
Fisk gave his organs opus numbers. However, some were never built due to cancellations. Some were merely restorations or additions to existing organs. Opus 1 through 24 were not built by Fisk. This was because he continued the preexisting opus numbers of the Andover Organ Company, meaning those organs were built by Byers.

Opus 24 through 27 were built when Byers and Fisk co-owned Andover, and opus 28 through 35 were built before the rebranding to C. B. Fisk, Inc. Opus 35 through 85 were built by C. B. Fisk, Inc., when Fisk was still alive, and the rest were built after his death.

=== Philosophy ===
Jones Boyds, an organist at Stetson University, wrote that Fisk had mixed views on the organ being used in an orchestral setting, citing Fisk's remarks: "[T]he fortunes of the organ and of the orchestra are to an extent mutually exclusive and my personal view is that the one instrument takes the place of the other [...] There is a human craving, musically speaking, for a towering musical effect. The organ satisfied this craving for hundreds of years before the 19th century orchestra took it over". Still, Fisk continued to study concert-hall organs since 1976.

Jonathan Ambrosino, an organ historian, wrote that although Fisk was inspired by older organs, he added his own personal touches rather than exactly replicating historical organs.

In 1968, The Diapason published an article, written by Fisk and entitled "The Organ's Breath of Life", in which Fisk argued in favor of using historical organ wind systems. In his essay, he wrote that organs with electrical wind supply should still capture "warbling" quality of a hand-cranked wind supply by making mechanical changes to the wind supply. This idea was negatively received in its publication but now is an industry-standard.

THE ORGAN IS…A MACHINE, whose machine-made sounds will always be without interest unless they can appear to be coming from a living organism. The organ has to seem to be alive.

— Charles Fisk, Organ's Breath of Life

In September 1978, Fisk wrote the article "Some Thoughts on Pipe Metal", in which he described the differences between the tonal qualities of metals used in pipes. He described lead pipes as "a darkness, a hollowness, a sound as of deepest antiquity [and] a strength of sound." and that tin pipes embodied the "sound of refinement". It was published by The American Organist and was cited by organists Jonathan M. Gregoire and Hans Davidsson.

=== Noted organs ===
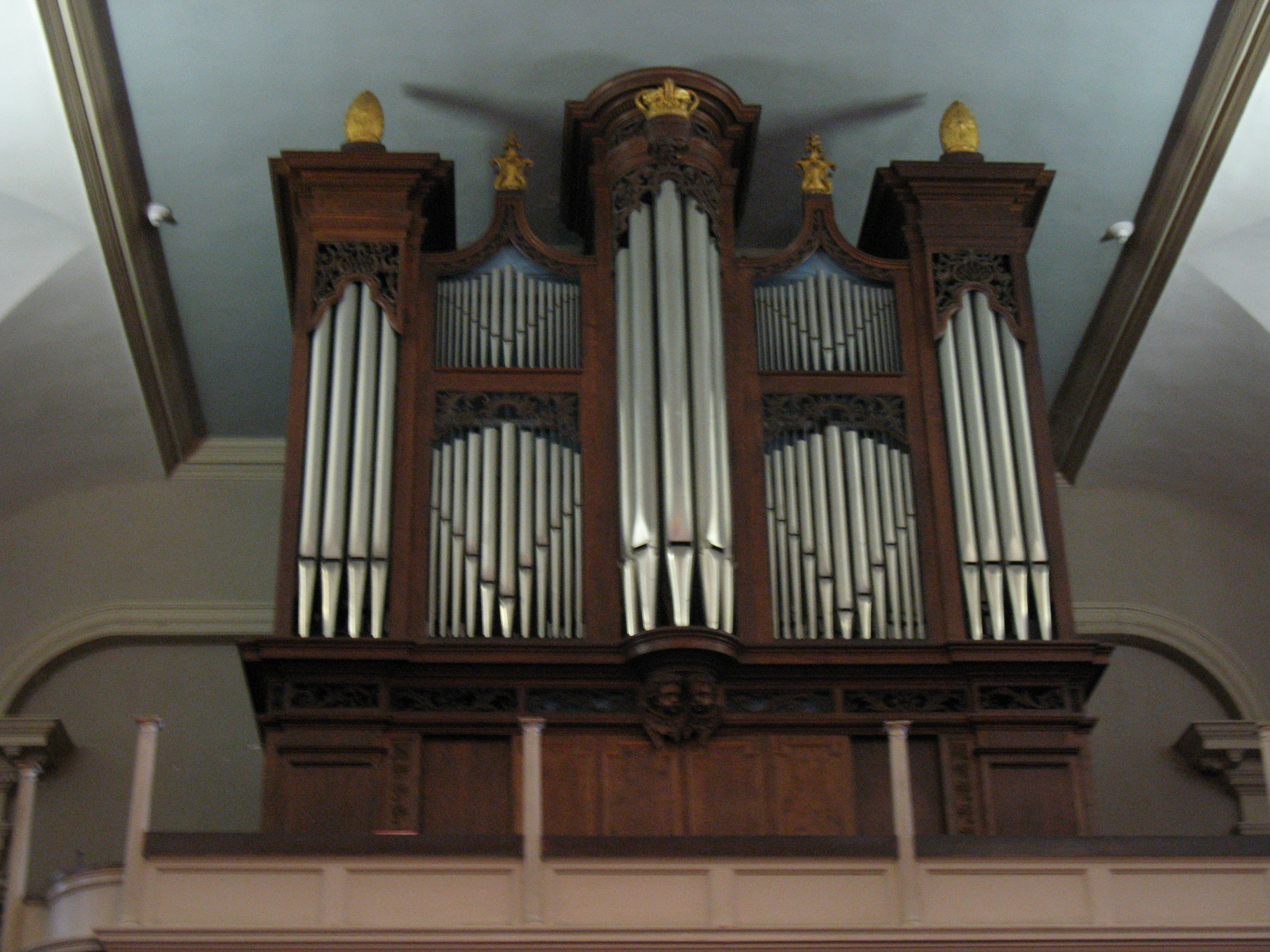
1964 Fisk organ in King's Chapel, Boston, Massachusetts (op. 44)

In 1958, Rice University commissioned the Andover Company to build a two-manual, 16 stop organ (op. 25) for its Rice Memorial Chapel at the price of $19,680. It was one of the first Fisk organs to be made completely from scratch. Opus 25 marks the last electric organ Fisk would ever make: all of his later works predominantly feature tracker actions. A historical feature found in this organ is the Rückpositiv. Rückpositiv is a smaller section of organ pipes that can be played separately from the larger main pipes. Though Rückpositiv can be easily seen in old organs, they became essentially extinct in the 1960s when this organ was built. This organ is also known as the Andover-Fisk Organ.

Fisk's first major work, completed in 1961, was a two-manual, fully mechanical-action organ for Mount Calvary Episcopal Church in Baltimore (op. 35). The design of its tonal and mechanical components was developed with advice from fellow organ builder Dirk Flentrop, while Fisk oversaw the final design, voicing, and construction. Its name, "Flentrop-Andover", was chosen because it was built when Fisk was still the president of the Andover Company. Andrew Johnson, an organist at Mount Calvary Church, described the organ as being "clear", "responsive", and as appearing to "shape the player". This organ includes two pedals that may be configured to activate specific stops to achieve a different tonal qualities, bypassing the need to manually pull the organ stops. These special pedals specifically affect the lower register section, called the Pedal division, of the main keyboard, called the Great.

In 1964, Fisk built the first modern mechanical organ, of three manuals, in King's Chapel on Tremont Street (op. 44), superseding an E.M. Skinner organ. Organist George Bozeman wrote in The Tracker that it provided a "vivid, rich sound, and a crystalline clarity that reveals the color and texture of each stop". In American Record Guide, William Gatens wrote that the organ sounded "thin and strident" and felt "dry" compared to Fisk's later works. According to Boston Globe, this organ, along with his organs in Harvard University and Old West Church, are "considered to be landmarks" in the field of organbuilding.

In 1967, Fisk built an organ for the Memorial Church of Harvard (op. 46). At first, Fisk made an attempt to renovate a pre-existing E. M. Skinner organ in Appleton Chapel, a smaller chancel of the church. Despite Fisk's efforts, an organ tuned for the chancel turned out to be unbalanced for the larger chapel, and vice versa. Accordingly, a decision was made to build a new organ; this time located in the chancel. As for the completed organ, organist Christian Lane said that the control of the wind felt "amazing and voluptuous". In 2010, the organ was relocated to the Presbyterian church in Austin, Texas, and was replaced by a 1929 Skinner Organ Co. organ. Because the Presbyterian church had taller ceilings, it was possible to install full-length 32 ft (~10 m) stops. In 2012, C. B. Fisk, inc. was commissioned to build another organ in the church's rear gallery (op. 139).

In 1970, Fisk installed a three-manual pedal organ (op. 55) that was inspired by Johann Silbermann's work at Old West Church, reusing casework from an earlier Thomas Appleton organ. According to a 1975 interview, removing the need to build entirely new casework lowered the cost of the organ. According to The Diapason, it is considered to be one of "the most beautiful contemporary instrument in the world."

In 1976, Fisk and Fenner Douglass installed a French classic-style organ at the University of Vermont's then-newly constructed music building (op. 68). Douglass was hired by the university as a contractor, who in turn recommended Fisk. Tonal planning was completed in 1975, which included a 16' Montre in the Great division. It was tuned according to Werckmeister II, an unequal temperament system. The main facade was inspired by the Robert Clicquot organ of St. Louis des Invalides in Paris, featuring five pipe-containing towers. At Douglass's request, the Positive case protrudes from the main case. Fisk decided to cantilever the Positive case right above where the organist would sit, allowing for sound to pass through the airshaft unimpeded to the organist. The organ replicates many of Classical French designs, though the lack of the 4' Clarion is notable.

In 1979 (or 1978) Fisk built a large four-manual, mechanical-action organ for the House of Hope Presbyterian Church in St. Paul, Minnesota, tuned in unequal temperament. The Musical Times described the organ as "neo-Schnitger" and its reeds as having an "abrasive" quality. Daniel Pinkham composed a suite titled Epiphanies for the opening of the organ, containing five movements. One critic praised the suite, though another believed the tonal qualities of the organ did not suit the composition well.

In 1981, Fisk built an organ (op. 83) for the Downtown United Presbyterian Church of Rochester, New York; it was installed in 1983. It has 2600 pipes, weighs 9 tons, and cost $300,000. Like many of his organs, it uses manual trackers rather than electric ones.

From 1980 to 1981, a historical baroque organ (op. 72), tuned in mean-tone temperament, was recreated and installed in Houghton Chapel of Wellesley College. It uses reeds copied from historical organs and historical organ wind systems. More specifically, the Rückpositiv and Brustwerk sections of the organ were recreated from the Friederich Stellwagen organ located in the Jakobikirche church in Lubeck. The four Brustpedal cantus firmus stops were copied from the Compenius organ located in Frederiksborg Castle in Copenhagen. Additionally, it was designed so the air supply can be supplied electrically or through manual pedals.

In 1981, another organ was planned for Palmer Memorial Church, a de facto church of Rice University. Though Fisk was chosen as the builder, he died before the construction. Thus C.B. Fisk, Inc., continued to build the organ. The design commenced in 1989.

In 1984, after Fisk's death, a four-manual organ (op. 85) was completed at Stanford's Memorial Church. Originally commissioned in 1973, financial and logistics issues caused a delay of 25 years. It is the largest organ in the Memorial Church and is named the "Fisk-Nanney" organ, referencing to the church's organist, Herbert Nanney. It is designed to accommodate two different tuning systems: meantone and well temperament. It is unique in that a lever above the manuals allows the organist to switch between the two systems. Manuel J. Rosales was consulted during the building process. In 1988, musicologist Mark Lindley published an analysis of the organ's tuning system. He found that the organ included tuning discrepancies, as some notes were few cents off from their proper tunings. More specifically, he noted that a) the diatonic major thirds were too small for the proper well-tempered tuning, b) chromatic notes were uneven when set to meantone mode, and c) the fifths in the well-tempered mode were tempered incorrectly. While Lindley notified Fisk of the errors, he died before the arrival of the letter. (See also Stanford Memorial Church § Organs)

In 1992, a Fisk organ was installed in Meyerson Symphony Center, Dallas, Texas. It was originally conceived in 1982. With a tonal design plan completed in 1983, this project was aided by architect I. M. Pei, acoustician Russell Johnson, and visual designer Charles Nazarian. Pei suggested that brass highlights be added to make the organ fit better with its surroundings. The Resonance division of the organ, which operates at high pressure, was made easier to play by using Fisk company's servopneumatic lever mechanism. The organ was well regarded by James Moeser, the former president of the American Guild of Organists, who described the organ as "one of the most important organs to have been built in this or any century".

== Appearance in media ==
Fisk has received media attention from various television shows and radio programs, such as NBC's Today Show, CBS's Sunday Morning with Charles Kuralt, and NPR's The Rest of the Story. In 2013, a 60-minute documentary film named "Opus 139: To Hear the Music" by Dennis Lanson was screened. The documentary details how C. B. Fisk, Inc. employees take to build organs and the life of Fisk.

After Fisk's death, two novels based on his life were published. One is titled The Organ Builder, written by Robert Cohen (ISBN 9780060159092). It was inspired by Fisk's life and work as described in his obituary in The New York Times. Another was published a few decades later, in 2020, when Stephen Kiernan published a novel named Universe of Two. The protagonist of the novel, Charlie Fish, is inspired by Fisk (ISBN 978-0062878441). A two-volume biography named Charles Brenton Fisk, Organ Builder was published two years after Fisk's death. It includes his writings and details about the Fisk organs.

== Publications ==
- "The Organ's Breath of Life". The Diapason: 18–19. September 1969.
- "The Architect as Organ Maker". Faith and Form – Journal of the Interfaith Forum on Religion, Art, and Architecture.
- "Pipe Flueways". American Organist Magazine. 1975.
- "Some Thoughts on Pipe Metal". American Organist Magazine. 1978.
- "How Certain Musical Differences between the Historic Organs of Germany and France were Achieved by Differences in Construction". L'Orgue à notre Époque. McGill University. May 1981.

== See also ==
- Glossary of music terminology
- List of pipe organ builders
- List of pipe organs
