= Sam =

Sam, SAM or variants may refer to:

== Animals ==
- Sam (army dog) (died 2000)
- Sam (horse) (b 1815), British Thoroughbred
- Sam (koala) (died 2009), rescued after 2009 bush fires in Victoria, Australia
- Sam (orangutan), in the movie Dunston Checks In
- Sam (ugly dog) (1990–2005), voted the world's ugliest dog in 2003, 2004, and 2005
- Unsinkable Sam (died 1955), a cat which survived the sinking of three ships during World War II

== Arts and entertainment ==
=== Film and television ===
- Sam (1967 film), directed by Larry Buchanan
- Sam (1986 film), a documentary
- Sam (2021 film), directed by Yan England
- Sam (1973 TV series), a British drama
- Sam (1978 TV series), an American crime drama

=== Literature ===
- Sam (novel), a 2023 novel by Allegra Goodman

=== Music ===
- Sam (Osvajači album), 1995
- Sam (Škabo album), 2003
- "Sam" (Olivia Newton-John song), 1977
- SAM Awards, for South Australian Music Awards
- Sam, in Indian classical music, the first count of a tala
- Stop action magnet, in a pipe organ

== Business ==
=== Brands and enterprises ===
- SAM (vehicles), a Greek truck manufacturer
- S.A.M.: Simply About Music, a satellite-driven radio network
- SAM, stock ticker of Boston Beer Company, the brewers of Samuel Adams beer
- SAM Colombia, a Colombian airline
- SAM Records, an American disco/post-disco record company
- Società Aerea Mediterranea, an Italian airline 1926–1934 and 1959–1981

=== Business terminology ===
- Serviceable available market
- Shared appreciation mortgage
- Social accounting matrix of transactions in an economy
- System for Award Management (SAM), U.S. Government supplier database

== Languages ==
- Sam languages, comprising Somali, Rendille and Boni
- Sam language of New Guinea
- Samaritan Aramaic language, an extinct liturgical language (ISO 639-2, 639-3 code: sam)

== Organizations ==
=== Museums ===
- Seattle Art Museum
- Singapore Art Museum
- South Australian Museum (museum code "SAM")

=== Other organizations ===
- Sahabat Alam Malaysia, an environmental NGO based in Malaysia
- Schule am Meer (S.a.M. or SaM), a former boarding school in Juist, East Frisian islands, Free State of Prussia, German Reich
- Scientific Advice Mechanism of the European Commission
- Serve America Movement, an American political party
- Society of American Magicians
- Swimming Association of Maldives

== People ==
- Sam (given name), a list of people and fictional characters with the given name or nickname
  - Samantha Ruth Prabhu (born 1987), known mononymously as Sam, Indian actress
- Sam (surname), a list of people with the surname
  - Cen (surname) (岑), romanized "Sam" in Cantonese
  - Shen (surname) (沈), often romanized "Sam" in Cantonese and other languages

== Places ==
- Sam, Benin
- Sam, Boulkiemdé, Burkina Faso
- Sam, Bourzanga, Burkina Faso
- Sam, Kongoussi, Burkina Faso
- Sam, Iran
- Sam, Teton County, Idaho, US, a populated place
- Samoa (IOC and FIFA country code SAM)
- Salamo Airport in Papua, New Guinea (IATA airport code SAM)

== Religious or legendary figures ==
- Sam (Book of Mormon), elder brother of Nephi
- Sām, a Persian mythical folk hero
- Sam Ziwa, an uthra (angel or celestial being) in Mandaeism
- Sam, Shem in Islam

== Science and technology ==
=== Biology, chemistry and medicine ===
- Phytelephas seemannii, known in Guna as 'sam'
- S-Adenosyl methionine, a common co-substrate involved in methyl group transfers
- SAM, a candidate phylum of bacteria
- Sustained Acoustic Medicine, a medical treatment for arthritis
- SAMtools (for Sequence Alignment Map), a data storage format for DNA sequencing
- Self-assembled monolayer of amphiphilic molecules
- Shoot apical meristem, a plant tissue
- Significance analysis of microarrays, in DNA microanalysis
- Spore photoproduct lyase, an enzyme
- Sorting and assembly machinery, a protein complex in the outer mitochondrial membrane
- Segmental arterial mediolysis, a medical condition affecting the arteries

=== Physics and astronomy ===
- Southern Annular Mode of southern hemisphere atmospheric variability
- Swinging Atwood's machine
- SAm, an unbarred Magellanic spiral galaxy

=== Software and computing ===
==== Security ====
- SAM card (Security Authentication Module card), holding cryptographic keys
- Secure access module
- Security Account Manager in Microsoft Windows

==== Other uses in software and computing ====
- SAM (file format) or Sequence Alignment Map, a data format used in bioinformatics
- Sam (text editor)
- SAM Coupé, an 8-bit British home computer
- Microsoft Sam, a voice for the screen reader in Windows 2000 and XP
- SAM, a New Zealand chatbot that discuss politics
- SAM Lock Tool, better known as Syskey
- Scene Apparatus manager, a fully automatic pump control system by IDEX Corporation
- Sequential access memory
- Simple Anonymous Messaging, a protocol specification used in the I2P network layer
- Simulation for Automatic Machinery, two minicomputers
- Software asset management
- Software Automatic Mouth, a speech synthesis program
- Synchronous Address Multiplexer, a chip in some 8-bit computers; see Color Computer § SAM
- Syriac Abbreviation Mark, a Unicode control character

=== Other uses in science and technology ===
- Sample Analysis at Mars, on the Curiosity rover
- Scanning acoustic microscope
- Scanning Auger microscope in Auger electron spectroscopy
- Scheduled Ancient Monument, commonly used name for British archaeological designation
- Small article monitor, screening for radioactive contamination
- Sparse antimagic square, in mathematics
- Stop action magnet, in a pipe organ
- Surface-to-air missile

== Sports ==
- Sam (mascot), 1984 Summer Olympics
- Strongside linebacker, gridiron football nickname
- Sam Maguire Cup, often known as "Sam", of the All-Ireland Senior Football Championship in gaelic football

== Other uses ==
- Tropical Storm Sam, various storms named Sam
- Salamo Airport in Papua, New Guinea (IATA airport code SAM)
- Sandy Area Metro, Oregon, US
- Sam FM (disambiguation)
- Special administrative measures, in US law
- Special Air Mission of the US Air Force
- Split attraction model, a psychology model about sexual orientation

== See also ==
- Uncle Sam, a personification of the US government
- Samsø, earlier Samsey, literally "Sam's island"
- Sam. (disambiguation)
