= London Handel Festival =

Annual music festival

The London Handel Festival is an annual music festival centred on the compositions of George Frideric Handel which was founded in 1978. The festival also features other composers, but its main purpose is to showcase a range of Handel's work. It includes a Handel Singing Competition, which gives the finalists opportunities to develop their careers.

== History ==
It was founded by Denys Darlow, who was succeeded as musical director in 1999 by Laurence Cummings. Between 2011 and 2021 Cummings combined his work in London with the artistic directorship of the Göttingen International Handel Festival in Germany. There is also a post of festival director currently held by Gregory Batsleer.

== Venues ==
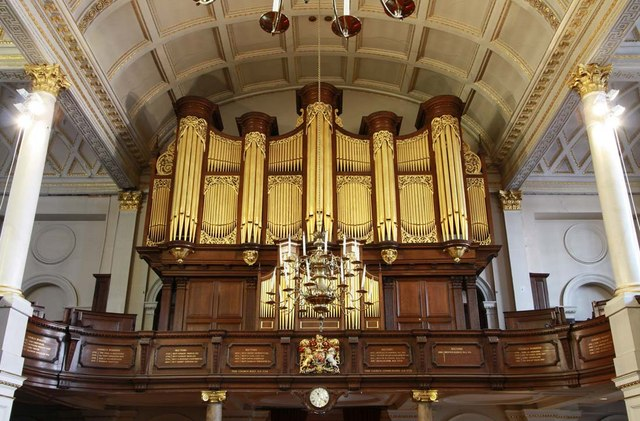
The organ of St George's Church, Hanover Square in 2009. The instrument has since been rebuilt within its historic case by Richards, Fowkes & Co.

A regular venue for concerts is the church the composer attended, St George's, Hanover Square, near his home from 1723, No. 25 Brook Street. The church and its organ were inaugurated in 1725, and Thomas Roseingrave was appointed as organist. However, although the case survives, the instrument has been rebuilt more than once. A chamber organ by Goetze and Gwynn has also been available to the festival. Until 2023 it was kept at the church, although it is intended to have a permanent home at 25 Brook Street.

Other festival venues with a Handel connection have included the Foundling Museum in Bloomsbury.

Productions of Handel operas are often given at the Britten Theatre, Royal College of Music. The venue has 400 seats. In 2019 there was a joint production of Berenice at the Royal Opera House's Linbury Theatre, a studio theatre of a similar size to the Britten Theatre.
