= Paul Fritts =

American organ builder

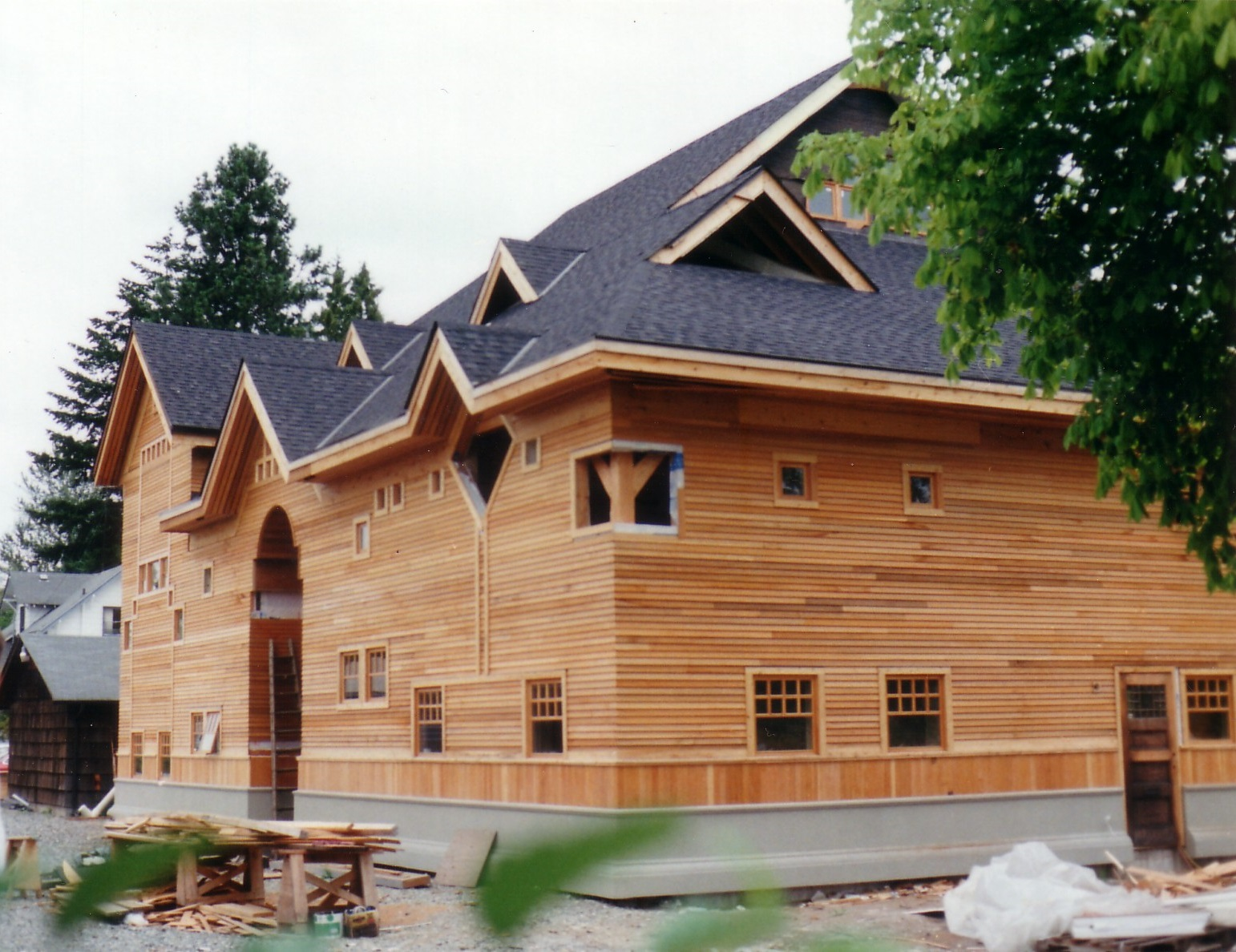
The organ shop of Paul Fritts & Company Organ Builders in Tacoma

Paul Fritts is an American organ builder based in Tacoma, Washington, who, following historical models, has created over thirty mechanical action instruments that have contributed to the revival of historically informed organ music. The Murdy organ at Basilica of the Sacred Heart (Notre Dame) in Notre Dame, Indiana is his largest Fritts instrument to date, with four manuals (keyboards) and 70 stops. Other recent Fritts instruments of note are located at the University of Notre Dame (2 man. 34 st.), Princeton Theological Seminary (2 man. 39), Hillsdale College (3 man. 57 st. and 2 man. 30 st.), and Pacific Lutheran University (3 man. 54 st.). The organ at PLU was the largest Fritts organ built before the organ in Columbus.

Several of the most notable American performers have recorded on Fritts organs, among them William Porter, Craig Cramer, Christa Rakich, and Robert Bates. In addition, the renowned German scholar and performer Harald Vogel has recorded on the Fritts organ at the Episcopal Church of the Ascension in Seattle (Op. 19).

Fritts is part of a larger movement of organ builders who, in the wake of the Organ Reform Movement, have sought to apply historical organ building principles in crafting modern instruments. This movement does not seek to copy historical instruments, but in some sense be "apprenticed to them." That is, Fritts builds Fritts organs, not Arp Schnitger organs, although the influence of the latter can scarcely be denied. Other builders in this movement include John Brombaugh, Richards, Fowkes & Co., Taylor & Boody, Charles Fisk, and Fritz Noack.

== Bibliography ==
- Whitney, Craig R. All the Stops: The Glorious Pipe Organ and Its American Masters. (Public Affairs 2003).
