= Richards, Fowkes & Co. =

Richards, Fowkes & Co. is an American organ-builder. They make historical-style mechanical-action pipe organs. The firm is located in rural Ooltewah, Tennessee, just outside Chattanooga and was founded in 1988 by Bruce Fowkes and Ralph Richards.

The company has created 23 instruments, ranging from a one-manual meantone organ for Mercer University to a three-manual organ with 49 stops at Pinnacle Presbyterian Church, Scottsdale, Arizona. Other instruments of note include a two-manual organ for the Duke University Divinity School chapel (30 stops), a three-manual instrument at Transfiguration Episcopal in Dallas, Texas (47 stops), and an instrument for St George's, Hanover Square in London, England (three manuals, 46 stops).

As part of a larger number of organ builders working in the wake of the Organ Reform Movement, Richards, Fowkes & Co. have applied many concepts from historical styles of organ building (Arp Schnitger and his pupils, Central German, and the late eighteenth-century Dutch style of organ building) to their instruments. Other builders within this movement include John Brombaugh, Taylor & Boody, Paul Fritts, Martin Pasi, Charles B. Fisk, and Fritz Noack.

== Discography ==
- Bach in New Brunswick: Art Bergwerff Plays the 2001 Richards, Fowkes Organ. Aart Bergwerff, organist. Raven, OAR-760.
- Clavier-Übung: Johann Sebastian Bach. Robert Clark, organist. Calcante, CAL-042.
- Desert Fugue. DVD and CDs, Documentary with Christoph Wolff, George Ritchie, Ralph Richards, and Bruce Fowkes. Fugue State Films.
- John Brock in Recital on a new Richards, Fowkes Organ. John Brock, organist. Raven, OAR-904.
- Tennessee Organ Tour Vol.2. John Brock, organist. Raven, OAR-770.
- Bruce Neswick, Organist. Raven, OAR-240.
- 21 Newly Published Organ Chorales attributed to J.S. Bach. Stephen Rapp, organist. Raven, OAR-420.

== Sources ==
=== Periodicals ===
- Ambrosino, Jonathan. Deep in the Heart. (Choir and Organ, 2010)
- Ambrosino, Jonathan. Gentle Mavericks. (Choir and Organ, 2009)

=== Thesis ===
- Oliver, David. Richards, Fowkes and Company: Representatives of a New Generation of North American Mechanical-Action Organ Builders. (DMA Thesis, University of South Carolina 1999)

=== Book ===
- Whitney, Craig R. All the Stops: The Glorious Pipe Organ and Its American Masters, Public Affairs (2003) ISBN 1-58648-262-9
