= First Religious Society Church and Parish Hall =

Historic church in Massachusetts, United States

- U.S. National Register of Historic Places
- U.S. Historic district – Contributing property
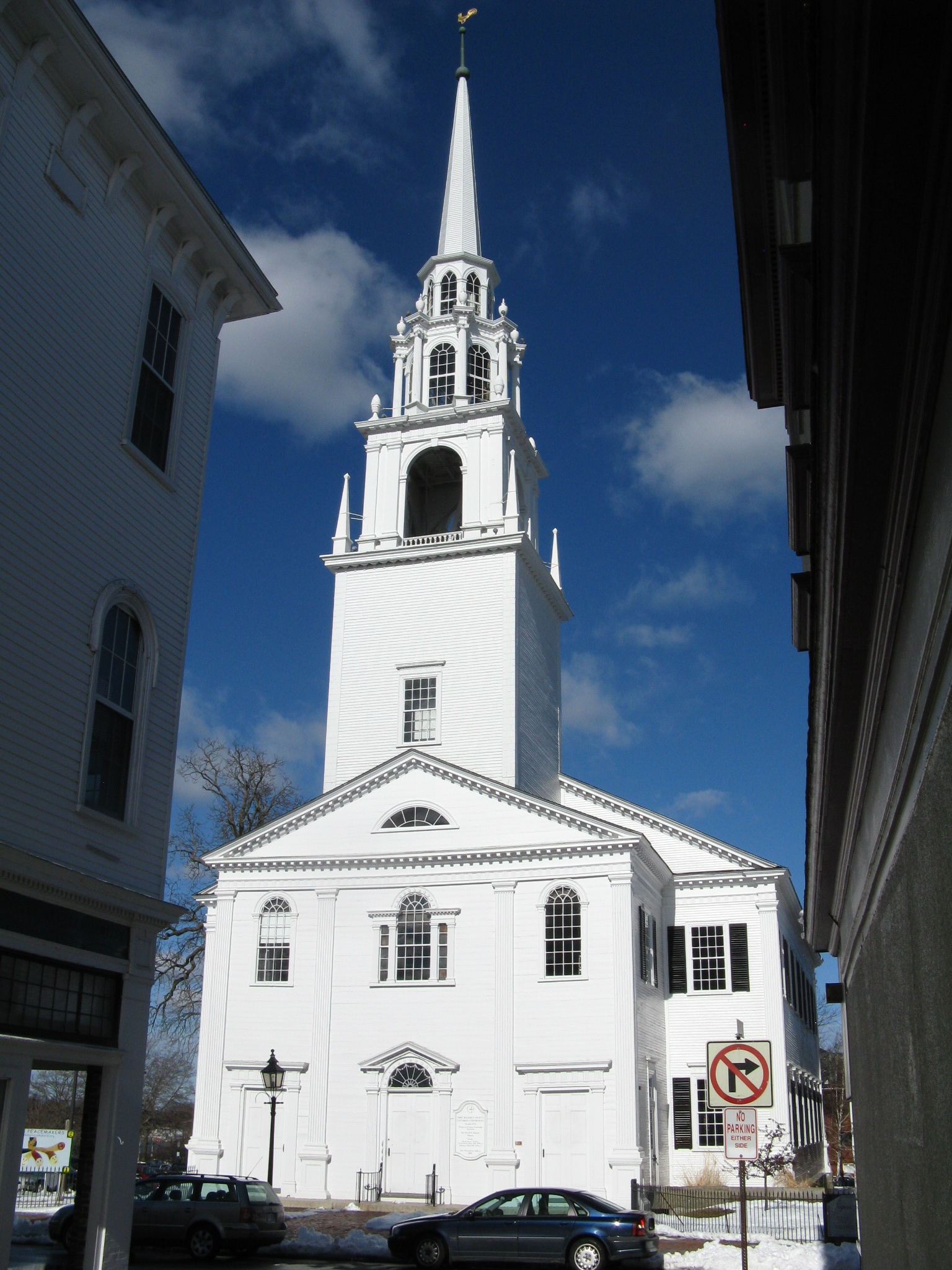
- First Religious Society

- Location within Massachusetts Location within the United States
- Location: Newburyport, Massachusetts
- Coordinates: 42°48′39″N 70°52′18″W
- Built: 1801
- Architect: Attributed to Samuel McIntire or Timothy Palmer
- Architectural style: Federal
- Part of: Newburyport Historic District (ID84002411)
- NRHP reference No.: 76000278

Significant dates
- Added to NRHP: April 2, 1976
- Designated CP: August 2, 1984

The First Religious Society Church and Parish Hall is a historic church building at 26 Pleasant Street in Newburyport, Massachusetts. Originally a Reformed congregation, the congregation is currently affiliated with the Unitarian Universalist denomination. The current Minister is Reverend Rebecca M. Bryan. The church's steeple is currently the tallest point in downtown Newburyport, Massachusetts.

The church building was constructed in 1801 by the First Religious Society, which was founded in 1725. The designer is unknown, but the names of Samuel McIntire of Salem and Timothy Palmer of Newburyport have been suggested. Like so many churches in the United States, the design of the church was based on the church of St Martin-in-the-Fields in London.

A stylistically complementary parish hall was added to the east side of the church in 1873. The space is utilized as a center for social and educational activities.

Barbara Owen served the congregation as organist from 1963 until 2002.

The building was added to the National Register of Historic Places in 1976, and included in the Newburyport Historic District in 1984.

== See also ==
- First Presbyterian Church (Newburyport, Massachusetts), also known as Old South, located at 29 Federal Street in Newburyport, a church that is similar in appearance (historic, white, tall)
- National Register of Historic Places listings in Essex County, Massachusetts
