= Kingfisher College =

College in Oklahoma, United States

- Type: College
- Active: September 26, 1894–1922
- Affiliations: Congregational church
- President: Julius Temple House (first)
- Dean: F. J. Titt, J. W. Scroggs
- Students: 117
- Location: Kingfisher, Oklahoma, United States
- Kingfisher College Site
- U.S. National Register of Historic Places
- Location within Oklahoma Location within the United States
- Coordinates: 35°52′00″N 97°54′30″W
- Area: 3 acres (1 ha)
- Built: 1890
- NRHP reference No.: 76001566
- Added to NRHP: October 22, 1976

Kingfisher College was a college in Kingfisher, Oklahoma, from 1895 to 1922.

== Bringing a College to Kingfisher ==
Founded by Rev. Joseph Homer Parker, a Congregationalist minister, the institution aimed to bring rigorous liberal arts education to the Midwest. Parker, who had established numerous Congregationalist churches across Canada and the Northeast U.S., and also founded the predecessor to Wichita State University, was deeply committed to this vision. A 1869 graduate of Middlebury College, he personally contributed $2,500 towards the 120-acre (0.49 km^{2}) campus.

=== Beginnings ===
First opened in an old hotel in Kingfisher on September 2, 1895, the college was the 42nd with ties to the Congregational church in America. The class of 1896 took classes in the Beard Building, and the class of '97 graduated from the Baptist Church. Parker Hall was completed for 1897, and held class as well as dormitories inside. In the following years, Gilbert Hall, Osgood Hall, and Seay Hall were all built. Dr. Moody was president until 1915, a period in which Kingfisher continued to struggle. After subsequent President George Hatfield's six-month tenure, Dr. Tuttle took control. Tuttle would remain president until the college's close. Enrollment was increasing until World War I, when it sharply fell. The college was forced to close in 1922, due to declining donations, cheaper tuition at schools such as Central State Normal School, and failed investments in a local flour mill, which closed due to falling wheat prices in the 1920s.

=== Athletics ===
A member of the Oklahoma Athletic Association, Kingfisher competed against the major schools of the state. Their signature sport was tennis: led by Rhodes scholar Roy Lange, Kingfisher won state titles in 1901 and 1902, dropping the sport after Lange's graduation. The 1901 Kingfisher football team had a 4-1 record; from 1897 to 1919, Kingfisher met the mighty University of Oklahoma Sooners a total of 22 times. Although Kingfisher managed a trio of scoreless ties in 1900, 1903 and 1904, the Sooners soon began to dominate, winning the other 19 contests easily, notching 100 points in three of the games (and 96 in another). The 1917 tilt ended 179-0, still the second-worst rout in college football history (eclipsed only by the Georgia Tech's infamous 222-0 win over Cumberland the year before).

Kingfisher was also strong in track and field, hosting the conference meet several times.

=== Alumni ===
A total of 117 students graduated from Kingfisher College, 55 women and 62 men. The graduating classes never exceeded 12, including two classes of two members. The two initial years both produced only one graduate. Despite a low number of alumni, three were Rhodes Scholars and three more qualified for the prestigious honor. One alumnus, Joyce C. Stearns, became an atomic scientist and worked on the Manhattan Project.

== After 1922 closing ==
The Pentecostal Holiness Church bought the site, where King's College was open for ten years before closing. The college waited until 1976 to be added to the National Register of Historic Places.

The records, degrees and library holdings were transferred to the University of Oklahoma, per a 1927 agreement by the Kingfisher Board of Trustees. The Kingfisher College Chair of Philosophy of Religion and Ethics was created at OU in 1951 after a thirty-thousand dollar endowment. Thirteen years later, the entire endowment fund was transferred to the University of Oklahoma.
