= Sam. =

Sam. may refer to:

- Books of Samuel in the bible
- author abbreviation for botanist Gunnar Samuelsson (botanist) (1885–1944)

== See also ==
- Sam (disambiguation)
- Samvat, era of the several Hindu calendar systems in Nepal and India
