= C. B. Fisk, Inc. =

American pipe organ company

- Formerly: Andover Organ Company
- Founded: 1948; 78 years ago
- Founder: Charles Brenton Fisk
- Headquarters: Gloucester, Massachusetts, U. S.

C. B. Fisk, Inc. is a company in Gloucester in the U.S. state of Massachusetts that designs and builds mechanical action pipe organs. It was founded in Gloucester in 1960 by Charles Brenton Fisk (1925–1983) after buying out its original owner, Thomas W. Byers.

== Charles Fisk ==
Fisk had been a nuclear physicist in training, part of his World War II drafted service included work at Los Alamos working on detonators. After graduation from Harvard University with a physics degree, he worked at Brookhaven National Laboratory. In 1950 he pursued graduate physics studies at Stanford University, but switched to organ studies, studying with Herbert Nanney, Putnam Aldrich, Rob Keine, and former Aeolian-Skinner installer John Swinford. He then pursued an apprenticeship with Walter Holtkamp in Cleveland. C. B. Fisk, Inc. is one of the first modern organ building companies to employ tracker actions in organs instead of electric ones.

== History ==
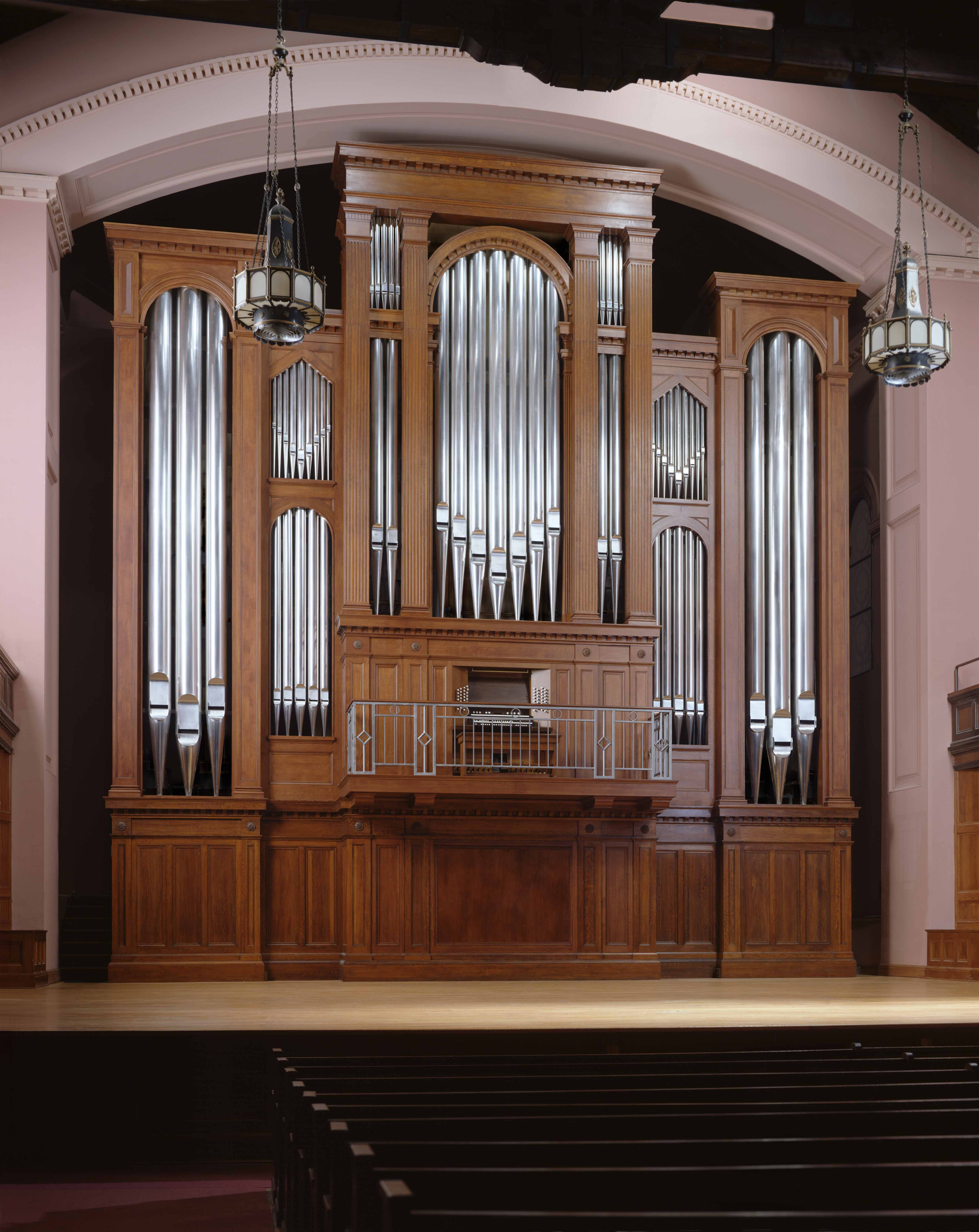
C.B. Fisk organ, Opus 116, in Finney Memorial Chapel, Oberlin College, Oberlin, Ohio. Note that this was made after Fisk's death.

C. B. Fisk was originally named Andover Organ Company and was founded in 1948 by Thomas W. Byers. Fisk partnered with Byers some years later. Like Fisk, Byers was an organ builder that preferred manual organs over electric ones. In 1958, Fisk became the full owner after buying out Byers's ownership interest. In 1960, Fisk changed the firm's name to C.B. Fisk, Inc. It was started in a more spacious recycled factory in Gloucester, Massachusetts in 1961. This had the employees move from Methuen to Gloucester to keep their jobs. So, some employees stayed and built a new firm with former namesake, Andover Organ Company.

In 1987 and 1986, the workshop was expanded again and now had around 20 employees.

After Fisk's death. C.B. Fisk, Inc. has continued to manufacture organs, with it becoming an employee-owned company after Fisk's departure. As of 2003, the firm had 30 employees and sold 2 million dollars of organs annually.

In its 50 years C. B. Fisk, Inc. has completed over 90 instruments in 23 U.S. states, Switzerland, Japan, and South Korea.

Notable organists Barbara Owen, Fritz Noack, and John Brombaugh were all once employed by C.B. Fisk, Inc. In addition, A. David Moore, Jeremy Adams, and the supervisor of the workshop, David Waddell, who was a childhood friend of Charles were all part of the staff. Some have moved on from the company and created their own organ-building companies, with Noack establishing the Noack Organ Company and Brombaugh establishing the John Brombaugh & Associates.

The president of the company since Fisk's death used to be Steven A. Dieck, but Michael Kraft assumed the role of president sometime after.

== Noted C. B. Fisk, Inc. organs ==
C. B. Fisk, Inc's first installation was in 1964 for King's Chapel in Boston, where Daniel Pinkham (who had contemporaneously studied with Aldrich) was organist; it was the first modern (since the advent of pneumatic and electric actions) mechanical tracker organ in the United States. Fisk took inspiration from older European organ designs like those of Silbermann and Cavaillé-Coll.

In 1999, the Lausanne Catedral decided to replace an old Swiss organ and made a $2.4 million contract with C. B. Fisk, Inc. This was controversial because World Jewish Congress lawsuit against Swiss banks has raised tensions between Swiss and America, with one letter saying that "[t]his huge, multinational American giant is coming in to steamroll the old European organ makers". The 40-ton organ was too large to fit in the place where the previous Swiss organ resided and therefore was moved to the nave of the cathedral, supported by large steel beams. An Italian car designer Giorgetto Giugiaro was assigned by the city to supervise the design much to the discontent of C. B. Fisk employees.
