= Royal Scottish National Orchestra Chorus =

- Symphonic chorus
- Short name: RSNO Chorus
- Former name: Glasgow Choral Union
- Founded: 1843
- Concert hall: Glasgow Royal Concert Hall, Usher Hall (Edinburgh)
- Music director: Peter Oundjian
- Website: www.rsno.org.uk/about/our-choruses/

The Royal Scottish National Orchestra Chorus, or RSNO Chorus for short, is a choir based in Scotland and founded in 1843. Its main role is to perform alongside the Royal Scottish National Orchestra. The chorus holds open rehearsals for potential new members, rehearses on Wednesdays in Glasgow, and has also toured around the world. It is directed by Gregory Batsleer.

== History ==
The Royal Scottish National Orchestra (RSNO) Chorus evolved from a choir formed in 1843 (then the Glasgow Choral Union) to sing the first full performance of Handel's Messiah in Scotland. Today, the Chorus' main role is to perform alongside the Royal Scottish National Orchestra, which it does in around six different programmes each year, including an annual performance (usually on 2 January) of Handel's Messiah.

== Membership ==
The RSNO Chorus has around 120 members from across the central belt of Scotland. The Chorus rehearses on a Wednesday evening in Glasgow at the RSNO's new purpose-built home at 19 Killermont Street. This purpose-built flexible 600-seat venue is used as a performance space, a rehearsal space for the Orchestra and Chorus, and as a recording facility (primarily for the RSNO, but also available for external use).

The Chorus regularly holds open rehearsals to allow potential new members to join for an evening.

== Artistic team ==
The chorus is directed by Gregory Batsleer. In 2015, Batsleer was announced that year's winner of the Arts Foundation Choral Conducting award.

Batsleer splits his time between Scotland and London. In Scotland he is also chorus director of the Scottish Chamber Orchestra Chorus, a post he has held since 2009, and in London he is the artistic director of the National Portrait Gallery's Choir in Residence Programme and principal conductor of the Portrait Choir.

The RSNO Chorus is accompanied in its weekly rehearsals by Edward Cohen. Cohen trained at the Royal Academy of Music, Indiana University, and the Royal Conservatoire of Scotland, where he currently holds a position as keyboard lecturer and staff accompanist. Cohen also enjoys a busy freelance performing career, and works with a number of choirs and ensembles throughout Scotland and further afield.

The choir's vocal coach, Polly Beck, studied at the RSAMD (now the Royal Conservatoire of Scotland), and later the postgraduate opera course at the RNCM, for which she won an entrance scholarship. Beck returned to Scotland to work with Scottish Opera, and has performed as a soloist with several UK orchestras, and in many festivals.

Beck currently teaches as a vocal instructor focusing on voice and performance skills for Inverclyde Music Service. She is also vocal coach for Inverclyde Senior Choir, and teaches at the University of Glasgow, the Junior Conservatoire of the Royal Conservatoire of Scotland and the National Youth Choir of Scotland.

== RSNO Chorus tours ==
In addition to concerts throughout the year in Scotland, both with the RSNO and independently, the RSNO Chorus has been invited to perform with orchestras in many different parts of the world, often at the request of world-class conductors. The RSNO Chorus has most recently toured to Prague, where they performed Mozart's Requiem with the Czech National Symphony Orchestra, conducted by Libor Pešek, as part of the Prague Proms. The Chorus has also toured to Copenhagen, Hong Kong, Israel, and Australia, among others.
