= Bridgewater Hall =

Concert hall in Manchester, England

The Bridgewater Hall
- The Bridgewater
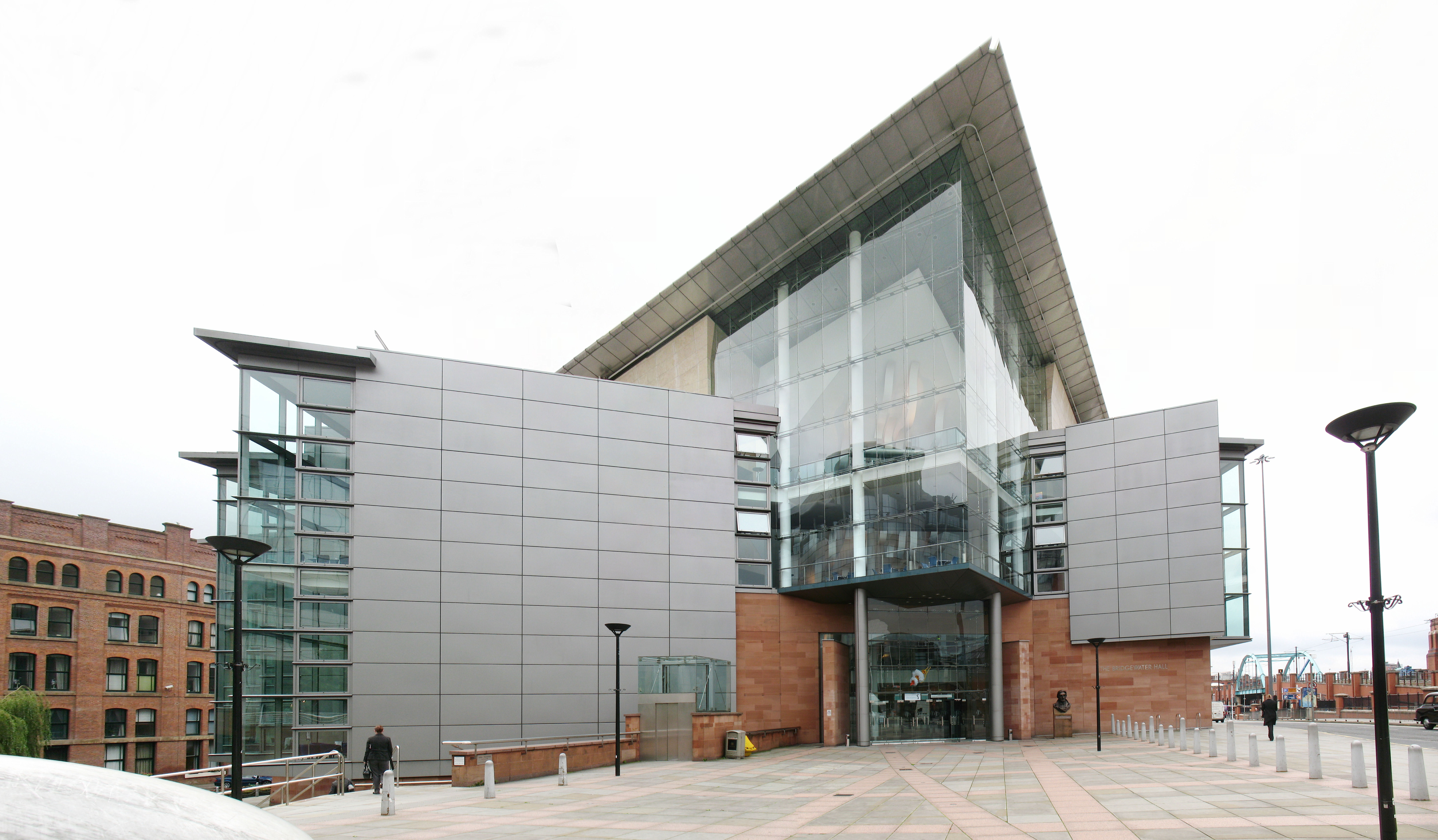
- Address: Lower Mosley Street; Manchester; M2 3WS
- Location: Manchester, England
- Coordinates: 53°28′31″N 2°14′45″W
- Operator: SMG Europe
- Capacity: 2,355 (+16 wheelchair spaces)
- Type: Concert hall

Construction
- Built: 1993–96
- Opened: 11 September 1996

Website
- www.bridgewater-hall.co.uk

The Bridgewater Hall is a concert venue in Manchester city centre, England. It cost around £42 million to build in the 1990s, and hosts over 250 performances a year. It is home to the 165-year-old Hallé Orchestra as well as to the Hallé Choir and Hallé Youth Orchestra and it serves as the main concert venue for the BBC Philharmonic.

The building sits on a bed of 280 springs intended to insulate it from external sound. The hall is named after the Third Duke of Bridgewater who commissioned the eponymous Bridgewater Canal that crosses Manchester, although the hall and waterside frontage is situated on a specially constructed arm of the Rochdale Canal.

== History ==
Proposals to replace Manchester's historic concert venue, the Free Trade Hall, were made after it was damaged in the Second World War, but the hall, which was home to The Hallé orchestra was repaired and renovated in the 1950s. Despite being a popular venue, the Free Trade Hall, built in the 1850s, had poor acoustics and outdated audience facilities. Throughout the 1970s and 1980s, several schemes to replace it were considered but the project became more likely in 1988 after the creation of the Central Manchester Development Corporation.

In the 1990s, land east of Lower Mosley Street and north of Great Bridgewater Street adjacent to the G-Mex exhibition centre (now Manchester Central Convention Complex) which was occupied by a former bus station and car park near the Rochdale Canal was identified as the site for a new hall. A competition inviting architects to present designs for the new concert hall was launched and a proposal by Renton Howard Wood Levin (RHWL) architects was chosen. The development included the construction of a basin on a specially built short arm of the Rochdale Canal and part of the Manchester and Salford Junction Canal, providing a waterfront setting for the hall.

The Bridgewater Hall held its first concert on 11 September 1996 and was officially opened on 4 December by Queen Elizabeth II and the Duke of Edinburgh. The concert hall was one of a number of structures built in the 1990s that symbolised the transition to a new and modern Manchester following de-industrialisation and the 1996 bombing.

The Bridgewater was well received and won a number of awards. In November 1996, only months after opening, the concert hall won the RIBA North West award. In 1998 the hall won the Civic Trust Special Award, which is given to a building which enhanced the appearance of a city centre.

== Structure ==
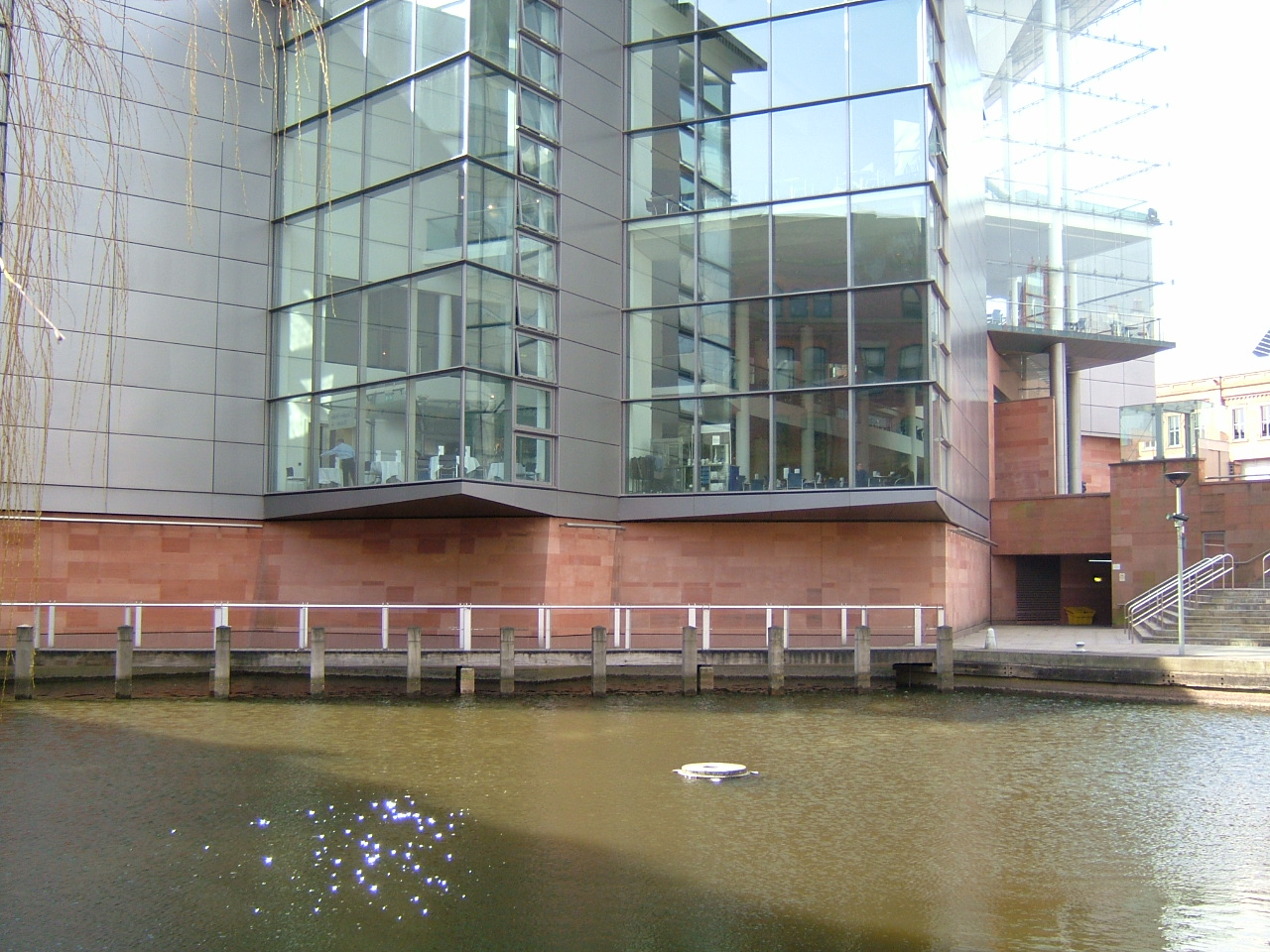
Bridgewater Hall overlooks the Rochdale Canal

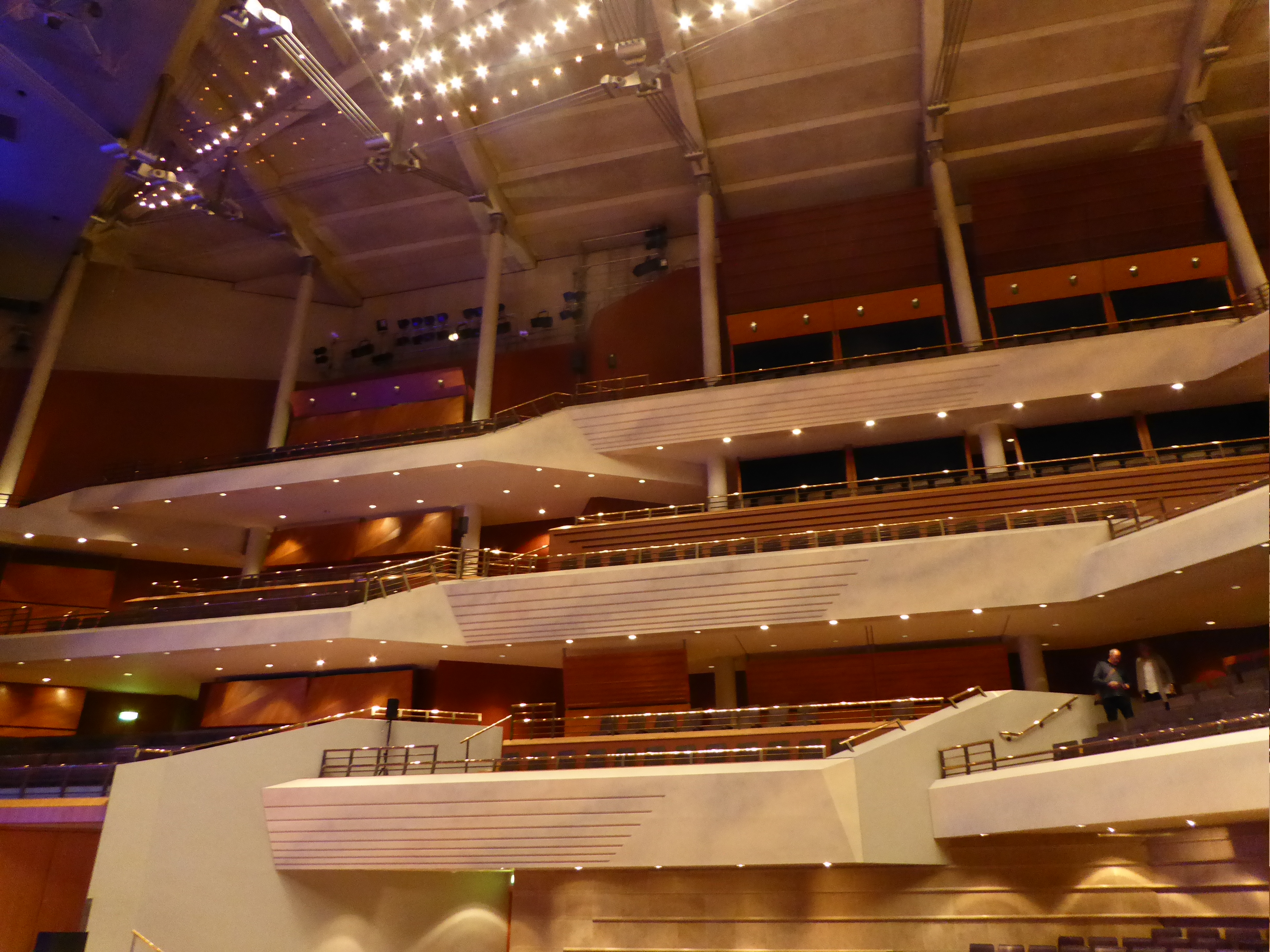
Interior

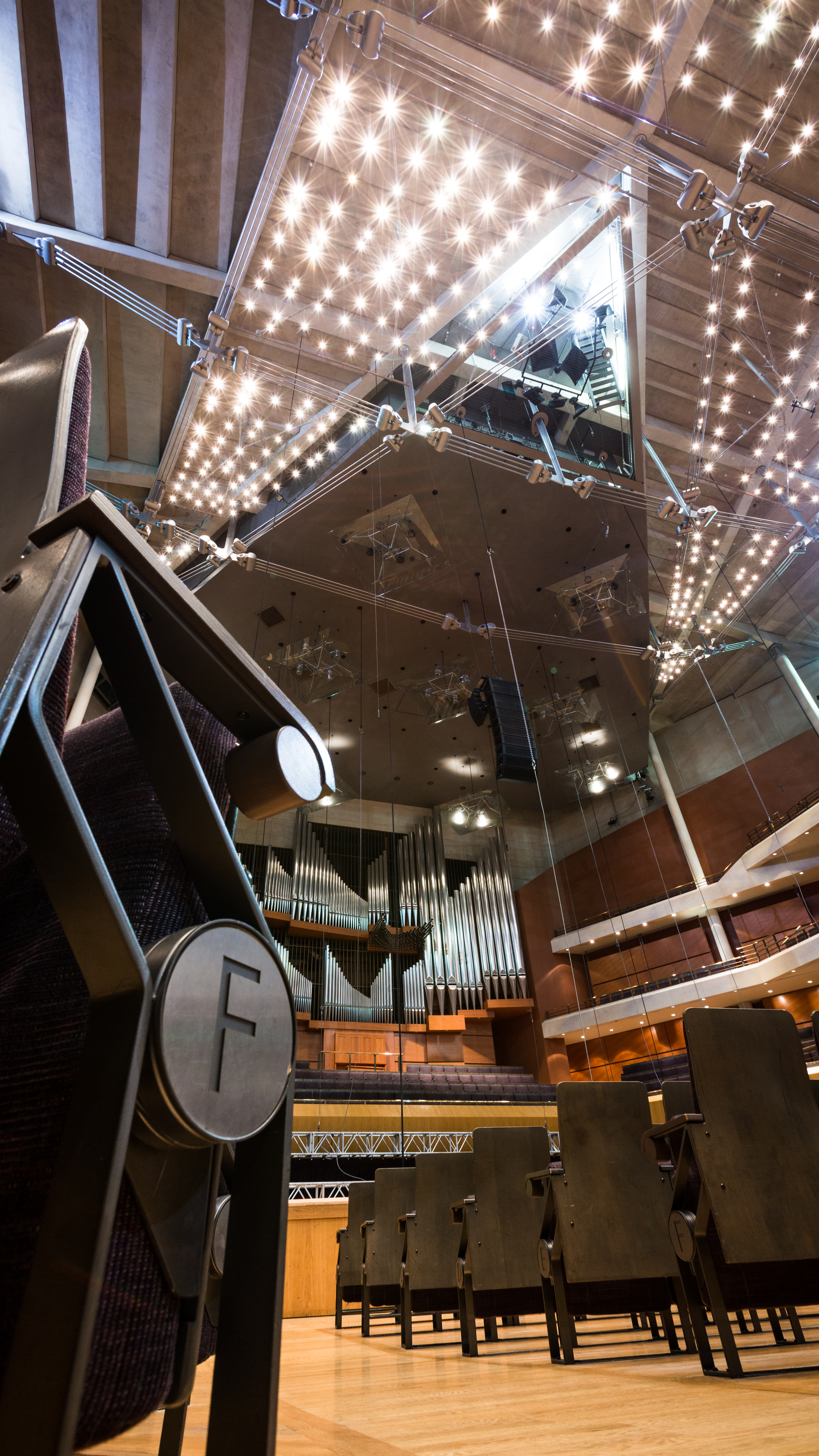
Main auditorium interior, showing the pipe organ

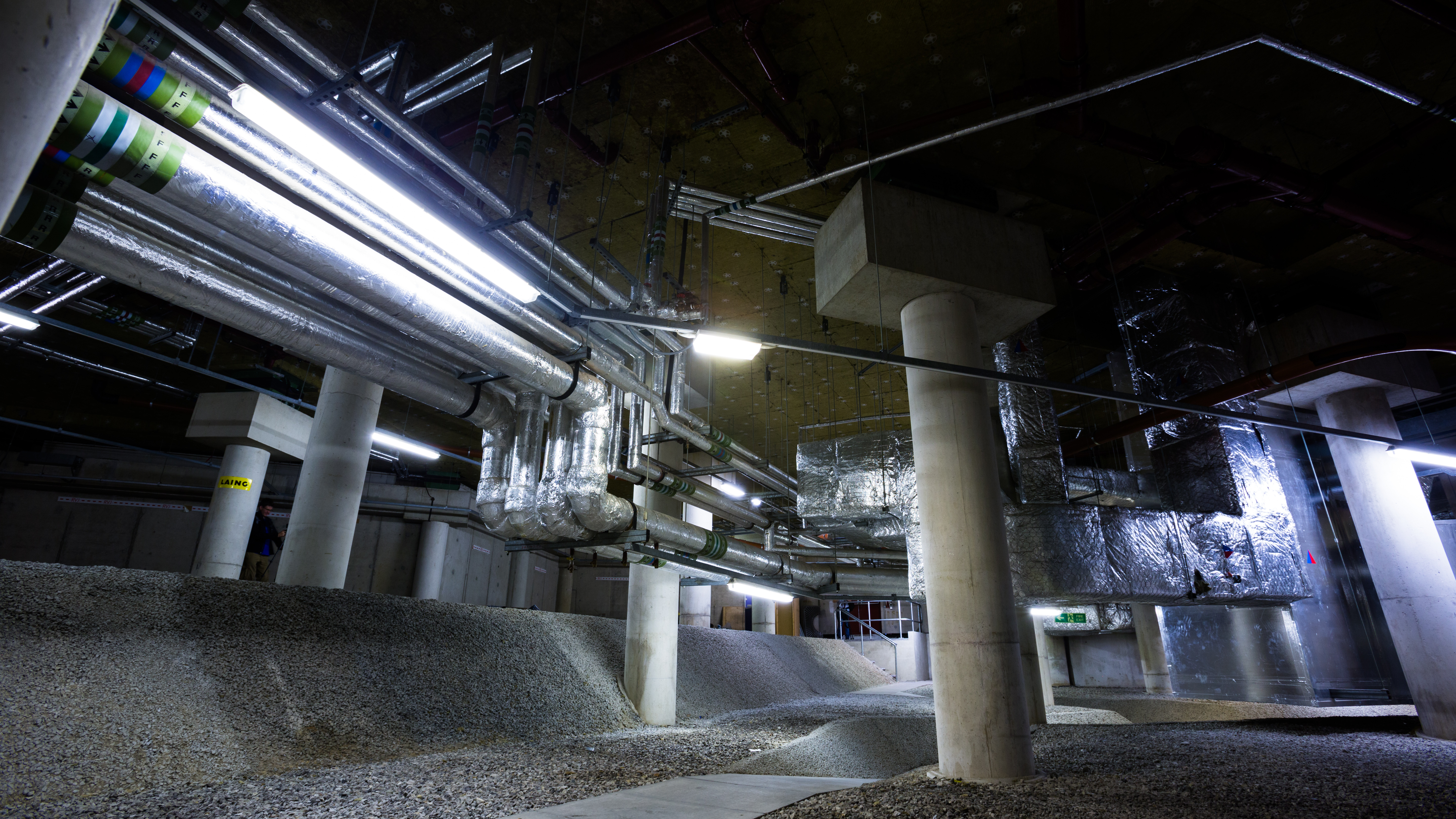
Vibration dampers / isolation bearings underneath the main auditorium

Construction of the hall was a joint venture between Manchester City Council and the Central Manchester Development Corporation; the project received significant funding from the European Regional Development Fund. The architects were RHWL and the builders were John Laing. The acoustics were designed by Rob Harris of Arup Acoustics in close consultation with the hall's intended musician residents. Arup were the building engineers. The Bridgewater Hall can seat 2,341 people over four tiers in the auditorium: the stalls, choir circle, circle, and gallery.

The main auditorium sits on a foundation of earthquake-proof isolation bearings that insulate it from noise and vibration from the adjacent road and Metrolink line. The hall's 26,500 tonne superstructure rests on 280 GERB isolation bearings consisting of rows of steel springs between concrete piers. The Bridgewater Hall is the first concert hall built with this technology.

The structure is mostly formed from solid, reinforced concrete, "moulded and cast like a vast sculpture" — even the ceiling is concrete. The auditorium has a double-skinned roof with a stainless steel outer shell. The lower part of the hall is built of deep red sandstone from Corsehill Quarry in Annan, Scotland; its upper walls are clad in aluminium and glass. The interior features significant use of Jura Mountains limestone.

=== Organ ===
Inside the hall, the focal point is an enormous, £1.2 million pipe organ, consisting of 5,500 pipes and four manuals, built by Marcussen & Son, which dominates the rear wall of the main auditorium. At the time of construction, the organ was the largest such instrument to be installed in the UK for a century.

=== Barbirolli Square ===
The plaza outside the hall is named for renowned conductor Sir John Barbirolli, conductor of great renown.

In the square is the "Ishinki Touchstone", a sculpture by Kan Yasuda made of polished Italian Carrara marble, a white stone with bluish-grey seams. The piece weighs 18 tonnes and was installed in August 1996. Its £200,000 cost was financed by the Arts Council, Lottery Fund, Manchester Airport, and Manchester City Council.

Beside the main entrance is a sculpture of Sir John Barbirolli by Byron Howard (2000).

== Usage ==
Since its opening on 11 September 1996, it has been the home of the Hallé Orchestra, the Hallé Choir and the Manchester Boys Choir, and is a regular venue for concerts by the BBC Philharmonic and Manchester Camerata. From September 2002, it has been home to the Hallé Youth Orchestra and Youth Choir, founded for musicians under the age of nineteen who are not in full-time musical education.

As well as concerts, the Bridgewater Hall hosts conferences and events for external organisations, such as award presentation evenings or annual ceremonies. Manchester Metropolitan University has held its graduation ceremony in the hall in July each year since the early 2000s. The Open University also holds one of its Graduate Ceremonies at the hall each year.

== Sources ==
- Ritchie, Berry (1997). The Good Builder: The John Laing Story. James & James.
