= Joyce C. Stearns =

American physicist

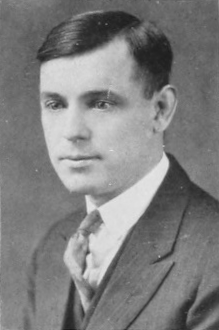
- Stearns in 1926
- Born: Joyce Clennam Stearns; June 23, 1893; Meadville, Missouri, U.S.
- Died: June 11, 1948 (aged 54); Webster Groves, Missouri, U.S.
- Education: Kingfisher College (A.B.); University of Chicago (M.S., Ph.D.)
- Spouse: Gertrude E. Fisk (m. 1921)
- Relatives: Charles Brenton Fisk (nephew)
- Scientific career
- Workplaces: University of Denver; University of Chicago; Washington University in St. Louis

Joyce Clennam Stearns (June 23, 1893 – June 11, 1948) was an American physicist and an administrator on the Manhattan Project. He resigned from the Manhattan Project in July 1945 to become dean of faculty at Washington University in St. Louis. He also served as the director of the Metallurgical Laboratory at the University of Chicago from November 1944 through July 1945.

Stearns has frequently been identified as a member of the Target Committee that selected the Japanese cities onto which the first atomic bombs were dropped. However, the oft cited Target Committee memos omit the given names or initials of “Dr. Stearns.” General Leslie Groves' memoirs identify his appointee "J.C. Stearns" as coming "from [General Henry H.] Arnold’s office.” Scholars including Gene Dannen and Sean Malloy have noted that an error must have been introduced in Groves' memoir, perhaps by a copy editor, as Dr. Robert L. Stearns was indeed affiliated with Arnold's office as a civilian who conducted operational research for the air force during the war, while Joyce Stearns was then director of the Met Lab. It therefore seems probable that Robert, and not Joyce, was the Dr. Stearns who served on the Target Committee.

Stearns was one of the seven prominent physicists who signed the Franck Report in June 1945, urging that the atomic bombs not be dropped in a populated area.

Stearns’ other duties at the Met Lab included training personnel who would be sent to the plutonium enrichment facility in Hanford, Washington. He was also responsible for recruiting numerous other scientists into the Manhattan Project, including his former student Harold Agnew, who went on to become the director of the Los Alamos National Laboratory, and Darol Froman, who became the deputy director of LANL in the postwar years.

Stearns resigned from the Manhattan Project in July 1945 to become dean of faculty at Washington University in St. Louis, following his friend, colleague, and former mentor Arthur Compton, who became chancellor. Stearns held this position for only three years, before he died of cancer on June 11, 1948.

Compton wrote Stearns' obituary for the Bulletin of the Atomic Scientists, which was founded by members of the Franck Committee immediately following the war. In it, Compton acknowledged Stearns' contributions to the Manhattan Project, but emphasized his accomplishments before it and outside of it. He noted: Stearns grew up in the vicinity of Kingfisher, Oklahoma, and he earned his bachelor's degree at the now defunct Kingfisher College. After earning his master's and doctoral degrees in physics at the University of Chicago under Compton, Stearns went on to become a professor and later chairman of the department of physics at the University of Denver. His research there included investigation of cosmic rays at a high altitude laboratory atop Mount Blue Sky. In the course of establishing his laboratory there, Stearns worked with Denver City Parks to have a road to the summit built. The scenic byway remains the highest paved road in the United States. In 1941 Stearns was elected a Fellow of the American Physical Society.
