= Central Manchester Development Corporation =

- Formation: 1988
- Dissolved: 1996
- Headquarters: Manchester
- Chair: Dr James Grigor OBE
- Chief executive: John Glester

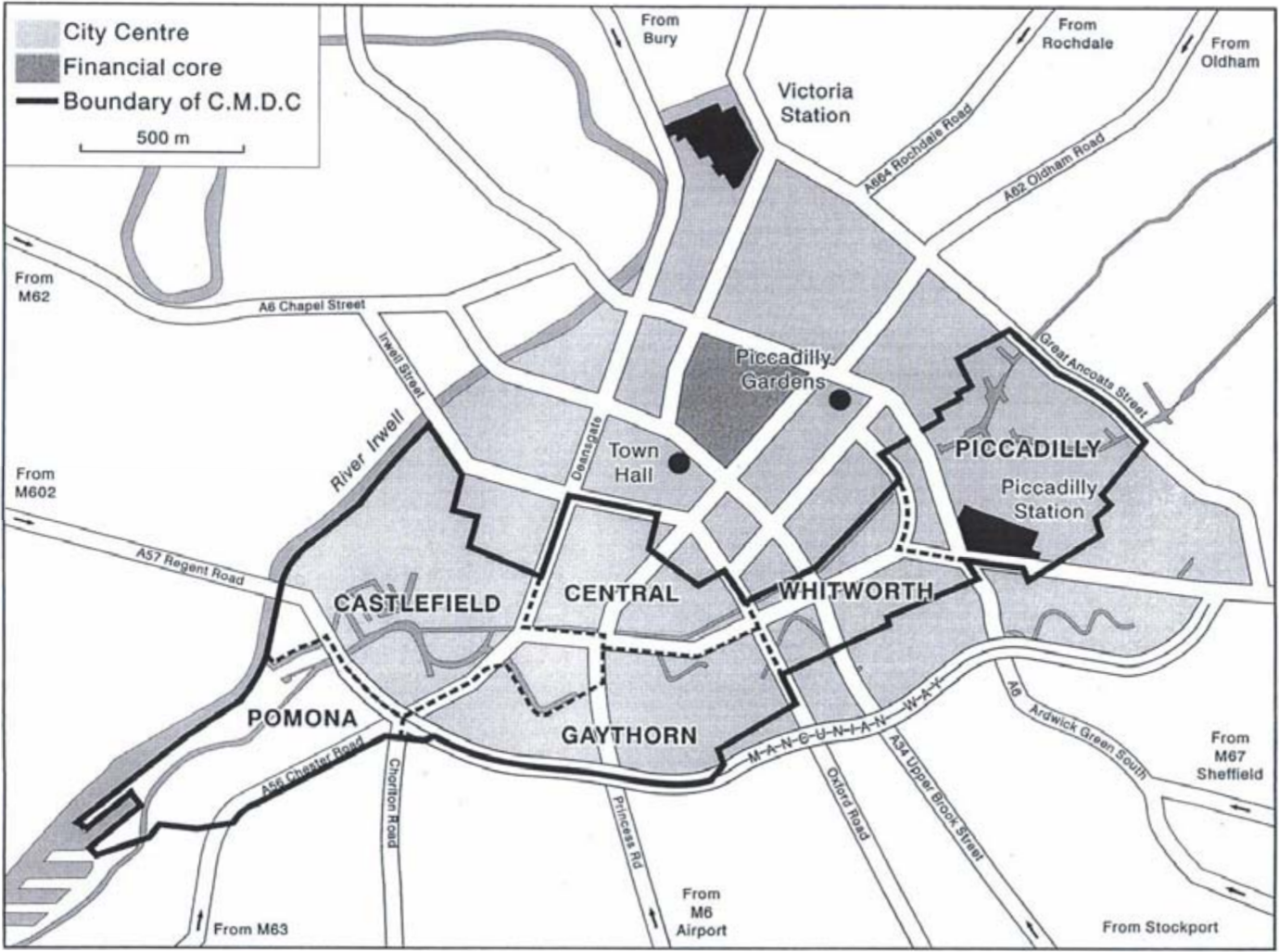
The six areas within the boundary of the CMDC: Pomona, Castlefield, Central, Gaythorn & Piccadilly

The Central Manchester Development Corporation was established in 1988 to develop parts of eastern Manchester.

== History ==
The corporation was established as part of an initiative by the future Deputy Prime Minister, Michael Heseltine, in 1988 during the third Thatcher ministry. Board members were directly appointed by the minister and overrode local authority planning controls to spend government money on infrastructure. This was a controversial measure in Labour strongholds such as East London, Merseyside and North East England.

Its flagship developments included the Bridgewater Hall concert auditorium, the Manchester Central Convention Complex and the Science and Industry Museum. During its lifetime, 1,500,000 square feet (140,000 m^{2}) of non-housing development and 2,583 housing units were built. Around 4,944 new jobs were created and some £303m of private finance was leveraged. Nearly 86 acres (350,000 m^{2}) of derelict land was reclaimed with 1.3 miles (2.1 km) of new roads and footpaths established.

The Chairman was Dr James Grigor and the Chief Executive was John Glester. It was dissolved in 1996.
