= Gregory Batsleer =

- Born: Manchester, England
- Genres: Classical
- Occupations: Chorus Director and Choral Conductor

Gregory Batsleer is a choral conductor. He is Chorus Director of the RSNO and SCO choruses.

== Career ==
Batsleer is Chorus Director of the Royal Scottish National Orchestra Chorus (since January 2015) and of the Scottish Chamber Orchestra Chorus (since 2009). He is also principal conductor of the National Portrait Gallery’s Portrait Choir. He previously held the position of Director of the Hallé Youth Choir (2008–11) and Director of Choirs at Manchester University (2009–13).

Outside classical music, he has worked with Elbow, New Order, James, Clean Bandit, and Damon Albarn.

Gregory is currently Artistic Director of Festival Voices as well as being Choral Director of the Huddersfield Choral Society

== Education and background ==
Batsleer began choral singing at the age of nine as a member of the Manchester Boys Choir before studying at Princeton University and the Royal College of Music. He returned to the UK in 2008 and co-founded and direct the Manchester Consort as well as taking up the role of Director of the Hallé Youth Choir. Gregory went on to direct and lead the Manchester University Chorus. He graduated from the Royal College of Music in 2012, where he majored vocal studies.
