= Manuel Rosales (organ builder) =

American organ builder

- Born: Manuel J. Rosales, Jr. 1947 (age 77–78); New York City, New York, U.S.
- Occupation: Organ builder

Manuel J. Rosales, Jr., (born 1947 in New York City) is an American organ builder whose instruments display a strong synthesis of romantic and contemporary styles. His workshop has built over 30 pipe organs with his notable output including collaborations on the instruments at Walt Disney Concert Hall and Rice University.

== Career ==
=== Notable instruments ===
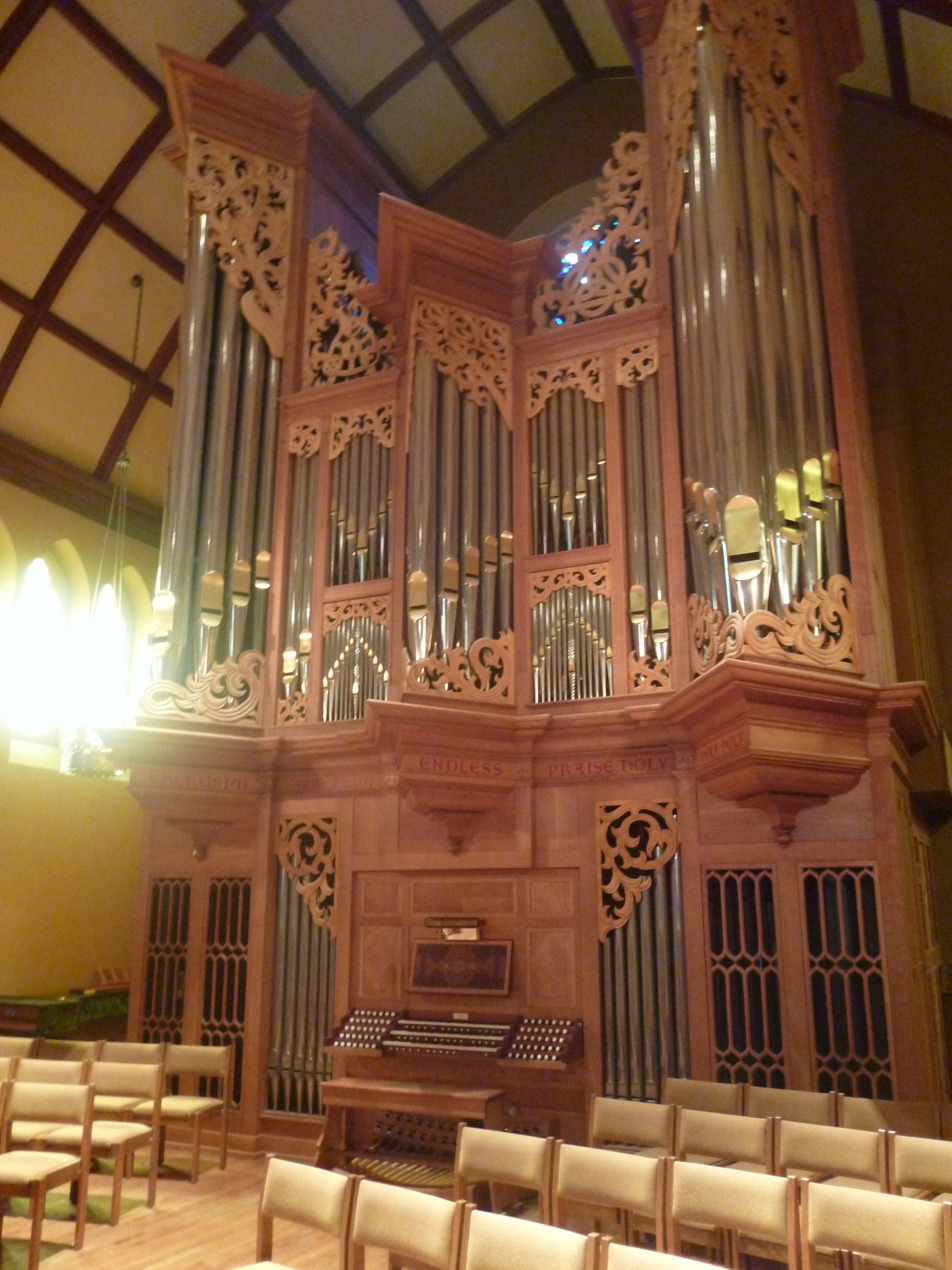
Rosales organ at Trinity Episcopal Cathedral, Portland, Oregon

Rosales achieved notoriety in 1987 with the bold tonal design of his new instrument for Trinity Episcopal Cathedral in Portland, Oregon. Built at a cost of $1 million, a substantial figure for an organ at that time, it is considered to be “one of the great organs in the United States”. Two years later, Rosales completed an organ conceived in the early Spanish style for Mission San José, joining a movement of American organ builders who, during the 1980s and 1990s, designed instruments in specific historic styles that embrace the literature of their period.

=== Notable collaborations ===
In 1995, Rosales collaborated with the organ building firm of C. B. Fisk in the design and voicing of a 75-stop organ for the Shepherd School of Music at Rice University. Designed along French classical and romantic lines, its full ensemble is intended to evoke the powerful and fiery tone found in the works of Aristide Cavaillé-Coll.

Rosales consulted on the organ for the Walt Disney Concert Hall, working for two years with architect Frank Gehry to arrive at a solution that would integrate Gehry's sculptural vision of an explosion of pipework with the musical requirements for a functional organ. Later, Glatter-Götz Orgelbau company of Owingen, Germany, built the instrument and installed it in 2004, with Rosales completing the finishing and voicing process later that year.

=== Indiana University and bankruptcy ===
In 1992, Indiana University contracted with Rosales to build an organ for the then-unbuilt Ione B. Auer Hall at Indiana University Jacobs School of Music. Then-chairman of the organ department at Indiana University, Larry Smith, chose Rosales to build the instrument because he was "uniquely talented" and, at the time, he was considered to be the "premier craftsman of organs" in the United States.

The organ was expected to be completed by 1997, however, Rosales "stray[ed] too far from the task", missed deadlines and did not physically install the organ at the university until 2001. Following delivery, the organ was discovered to contain profound design and mechanical flaws rendering the instrument an "overgrown jungle of trackers and howling ciphers" that failed to conform to the specifications of the contract.

Indiana University paid $750,000 to Rosales for the contract. However, in 2004, Indiana University, unable to sue Rosales due to an arbitration clause in the contract, initiated arbitration, claiming 2 million dollars in damages. Under mounting pressure from the university, Rosales' firm, Rosales Organ Builders, Inc., filed for bankruptcy in February 2005 and did not complete the instrument.

In 2007, the university reached the final stages of negotiations with the organ builder C. B. Fisk to transform and rebuild the instrument originally built by Rosales. The original case surrounding the organ was retained with minor modifications and the entire instrument was moved backward against the rear wall and extended upward to improve acoustical response. Installation of the Fisk organ began in June 2009 followed by a series of dedication recitals performed in April and May 2010.
