= Sam (surname) =

Sam is a surname. Notable people with the surname include:

- Alfred Sam (c.1880–1930s), Gold Coast trader and Back-to-Africa pioneer
- Andre' Sam (born 1999), American football player
- Christian Sam (born 1996), American football player
- Eliza Sam or Cen Lixiang (born 1984), Chinese-Canadian actress
- Grace Y. Sam (born 1949), Palauan politician
- Leman Sam (born 1951), Turkish singer and songwriter
- Michael Sam (born 1990), American gridiron football player
- P. K. Sam (born 1983), American gridiron football player
- Şevval Sam (born 1973), Turkish singer and actress
- Shivanna Sam, Trinidad and Tobago politician
- Tirésias Simon Sam (1835–1916), Haitian politician, President of Haiti 1896–1902
- Tony Sam, American stand-up comedian
- Vilbrun Guillaume Sam (1859–1915), Haitian politician, President of Haiti 1915

== Cantonese ==
- Cen (surname) (岑), romanized "Sam" in Cantonese
- Shen (surname) (沈), often romanized "Sam" in Cantonese

== See also ==
- Sam (given name)
- Sam (disambiguation)
