= First Presbyterian Church (Newburyport, Massachusetts) =

Coordinates: 42°48′31″N 70°51′58″W

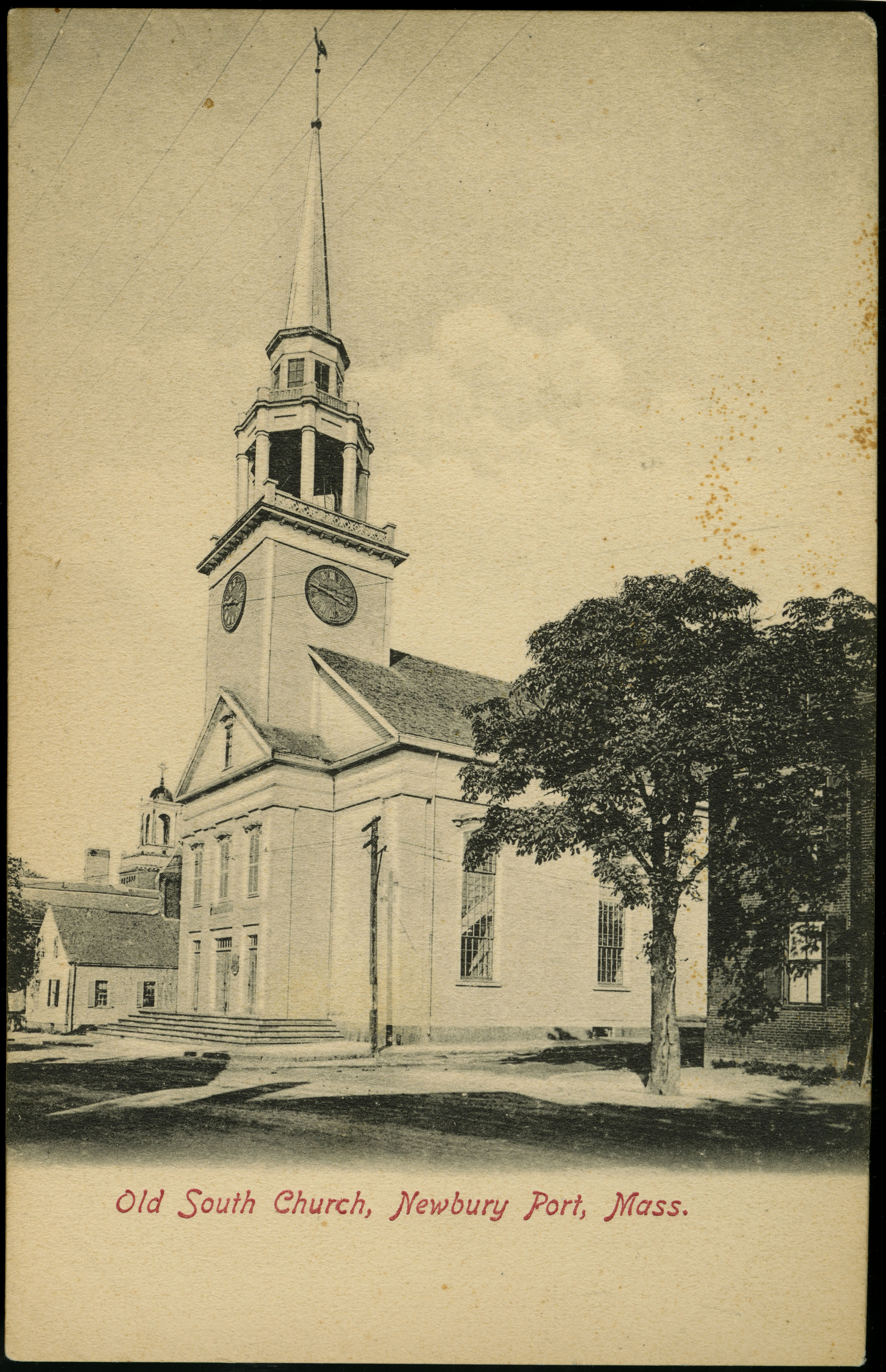
Church on a vintage postcard

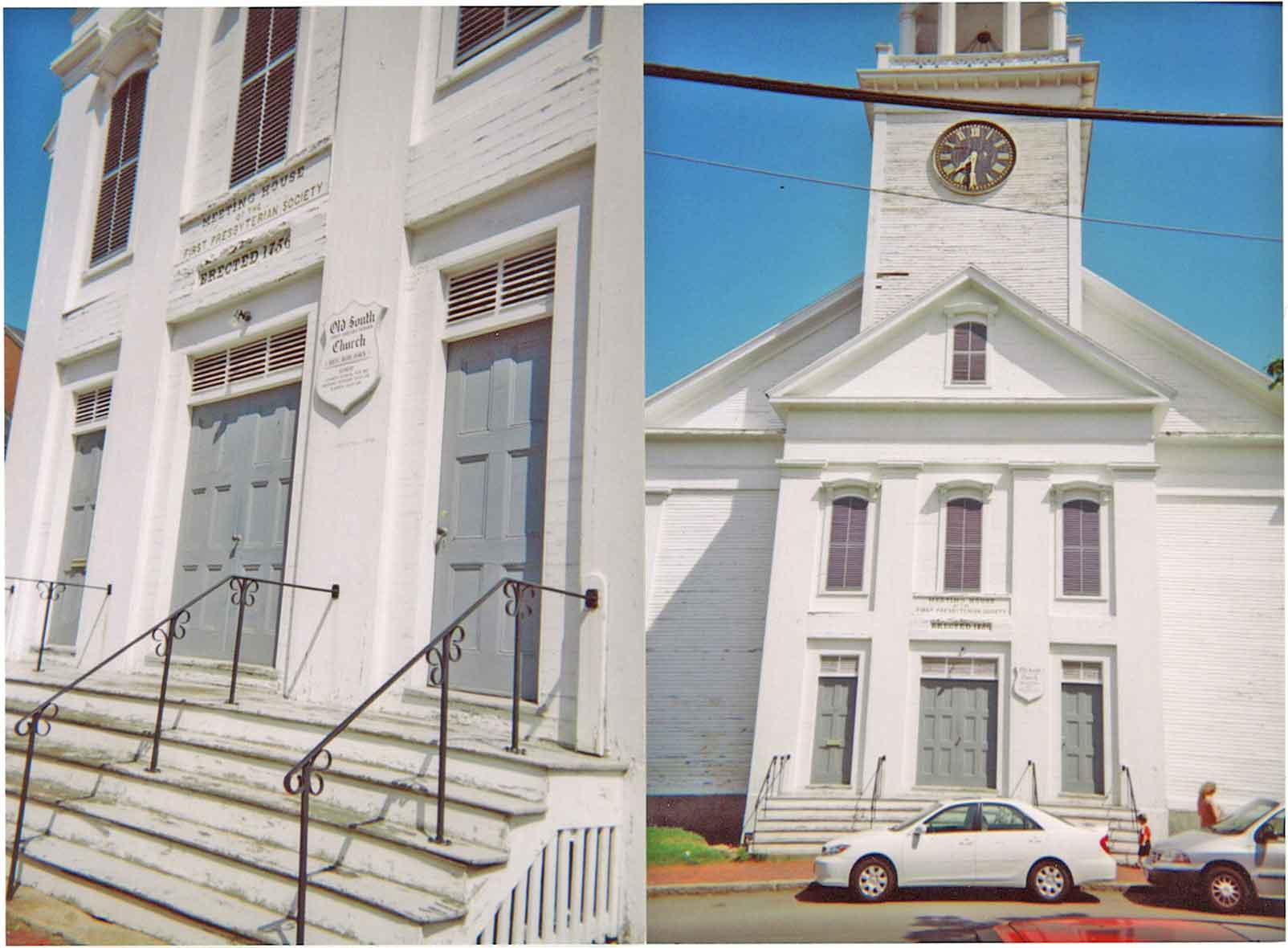
Old South church in 2005.

First Presbyterian Church, also known as Old South, is a Presbyterian congregation in Newburyport, Massachusetts that is part of the Presbyterian Church (USA). The church building is located at 29 Federal Street in Newburyport. The current pastor is the Reverend Laurel Cockrill.

The congregation began meeting in April 1746, following the ministry of the Methodist evangelist and preacher George Whitefield in the region. In 1756, over 100 men constructed the current meetinghouse on Federal Street in 3 days. Whitefield died in the church parsonage in 1770 while visiting Jonathan Parsons, and his remains were buried under the pulpit of the meeting house at his request.

The bell in the clock tower was cast by Paul Revere.

Among the notable people to attend church were "Lord" Timothy Dexter, Capt. Abraham Wheelwright, Isaac Wheelwright, Caleb Cushing, Adolphus Greely, and Samuel Tufts.

== See also ==
- First Religious Society Church and Parish Hall, 26 Pleasant Street, Newburyport, a church similar in appearance (white, historic)
