= Manchester Boys Choir =

British choir

The Manchester Boys Choir was founded in 1981 by Adrian P. Jessett. From 1996 to 2003 it was the Choir in Residence at The Bridgewater Hall.

It closed following a change of directorship in 2001 and the subsequent ending of funding by the local education authority due to falling membership numbers and falling standards of performance.

In 2013 the founder was jailed following a sexual abuse case in the choir.
