= Organ Historical Society =

Organization for pipe organ enthusiasts

- Abbreviation: OHS
- Founded: 1956; 70 years ago
- Founder: Barbara Owen
- Headquarters: Villanova, Pennsylvania
- Website: organhistoricalsociety.org

The Organ Historical Society is a not-for-profit organization primarily composed of pipe organ enthusiasts interested in the instrument's design, construction, conservation and use in musical performance. Formed in 1956, the headquarters moved from Richmond, Virginia, to Villanova, Pennsylvania, in 2017.

The main activities of the Society include promoting an active interest in the organ and its builders, particularly those in North America, through publishing efforts, national conventions, and preservation of library and archival materials. The Society also works to encourage the historic preservation and integrity of noteworthy instruments. Members consider organs in their larger context, and their audiences, builders, case designs, construction, geographical distribution, history, marketing, physical attributes, sound, and voicing receive the emphasis of attention. The society aims to be a ready resource for nonmembers seeking to discover the significance and potential avenues of restoration for instruments in their care.

The society sometimes gets involved with local efforts to preserve or replace pipe organs, as on the Duke University campus in 1988 or with two Pittsburgh-area organs in 2010.

== Archives ==
The organization maintains an extensive online database of historic and modern organs as well as an extensive archive of organ research materials. As of November 2018, the database held 63,913 entries for new, rebuilt, or relocated organs; 30,053 photos; and 21,512 stoplists. It includes organs built in North America (United States, Canada, and Mexico) and installed domestically or abroad, and organs built in Europe and installed in North America. The database committee solicits information to update and improve entries.

== Publications ==
The Organ Historical Society publishes a society magazine, The Tracker, and numerous publications through the OHS Press.

The Tracker includes news and articles about the organ and its history, organbuilders, exemplary organs, regional surveys of instruments, and the music played on the organ. The emphasis is on American organ topics of the 18th, 19th, and 20th centuries, and there are occasional articles on European topics. The Tracker is published quarterly, and contains many illustrations, vivid color photographs, and reprints of historic photos. Originally the focus of the society was on 18th and 19th-century tracker organs but in recent years there has been a significant expansion of interest in early-to-mid-20th century electropneumatic church and concert-hall organs. Historic restorations of theater organs are occasionally covered.

The OHS Press was established by the Organ Historical Society for the advancement and dissemination of scholarship about the organ, its music, literature, cultural contexts, and performance. The OHS Press accepts for publication material regardless of commercial viability if it supports the society's goals.

== Conventions ==
The Organ Historical Society hosts annual conventions. Over the course of a week, attendees may attend numerous concerts in various venues in the convention's host city and its surrounding area featuring a wide variety of historic pipe organs.

The purpose in visiting the instruments is to appreciate, hear, and see them in their surroundings, compare them with similar instruments, and experience their aural, mechanical and visual attributes. Demonstrations are intended to showcase the instruments.

There is an emphasis on organs that have not been significantly altered, enabling listeners to gain an unadulterated appreciation of representative work of historic builders.

== See also ==
- List of pipe organ builders
- List of pipe organs
