= The Diapason =

Professional trade publication

- Categories: Professional magazine
- Circulation: 4,000
- Founded: 1909
- Company: Organ Legacy Media, LLC
- Country: United States
- Based in: Portage, Indiana
- Language: English
- Website: www.thediapason.com
- ISSN: 0012-2378

The Diapason is a magazine serving those who have interest in the organ, church music, harpsichord, and carillon. Content includes concert and recital announcements, information on building and maintaining organs, profiles of notable organists and church musicians, news about the harpsichord and carillon, and more.

As of July 2024, The Diapason reaches about 4,000 subscribers. Until December 1967, it billed itself as the official journal of the American Guild of Organists and the Royal Canadian College of Organists.

== History and profile ==
The magazine was founded in 1909 by Siegfried E. Gruenstein, who also served as its first editor. Its first publication date was December 1, 1909. It is currently owned and published by Organ Legacy Media, LLC.
