= Barbara Owen (organist) =

American organist and organ scholar (1933–2024)

- Owen in the 1990s
- Born: January 25, 1933; Utica, New York, U.S.
- Died: October 14, 2024 (aged 91); Topsfield, Massachusetts, U.S.
- Education: Westminster Choir College; Boston University
- Occupations: Organist; Musicologist; Music librarian
- Organizations: First Religious Society Church and Parish Hall; Organ Historical Society; American Guild of Organists
- Awards: Curt Sachs Award

Barbara J. Owen (January 25, 1933 – October 14, 2024) was an American organist and scholar of the organ, who also worked as a university librarian and in executive positions for the American Guild of Organists and other organizations around the organ.

== Life and career ==
Born in Utica, New York, on January 25, 1933, Owen attended Westminster Choir College, studying organ and receiving a bachelor's degree in music in 1955. She achieved a master's degree in musicology from Boston University in 1962 where she had studied with Karl Geiringer. In 1975 and 1977 she took summer classes in Europe at the North German Organ Academy; in 1985 she attended a similar course at the Academy of Italian Organ Music.

=== Organist ===
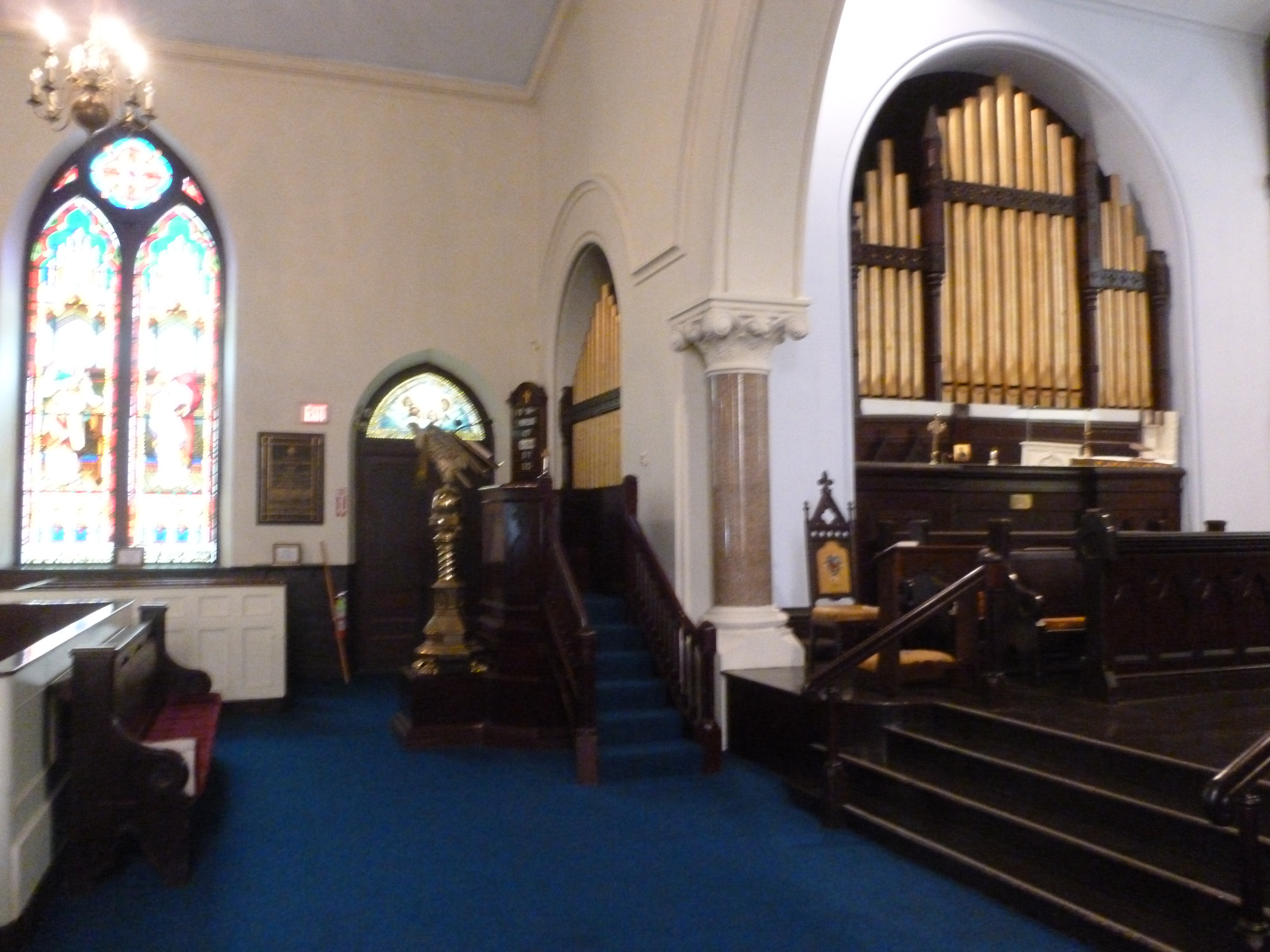
Interior of Saint Anne's Episcopal Church

Owen began her performing career at churches in Connecticut and Massachusetts soon after graduating from Westminster. She became music director of the First Religious Society Unitarian Church in Newburyport, Massachusetts, in 1963. In 2002, she moved on to an appointment at St. Anne's Episcopal Church in Lowell, Massachusetts, where she remained until 2007. Concurrently, she was pipe voicer for the organ builder C. B. Fisk from 1961 to 1979.

=== Research ===
For much of her career, Owen focused on the study and promotion of American music. She initiated the study of Anglo-American organs as a sub-discipline in the 1950s. She founded the Organ Historical Society in 1956 and served as its president.

In 1985, she became librarian of the Organ Library of the American Guild of Organists at Boston University. She held numerous other positions for the Guild, serving as dean and councilor for several of its regions. She was named an advisory member of the board of the Instituto de Organos Historicos de Oaxaca in 2005, and in 1990 became a trustee of Methuen Memorial Music Hall. Owen retired from her librarianship in 2012, receiving the title of "Librarian Emerita" for her service.

She was active in many fields around the organ, as builder, restorer, researcher, writer, editor, lecturer, hymn writer and librarian. Her books include standard works about 19th-century organ builders and players, books about Baroque organ registrations and the organ music by Brahms, a biography of E. Power Biggs, and monographs of individual organs including the Salt Lake Tabernacle organ and the Methuen Memorial Music Hall organ.

Her scholarship in the field of organ music led to numerous prizes, such as a fellowship from the National Endowment for the Humanities (1974–75); the Westminster Choir College Alumni Citation of Merit (1988); the Organ Historical Society Distinguished Service Award (1988); the American Musical Instrument Society Curt Sachs Award (1994); and the AGO Organ Library Max Miller Book Award (2009). In 2014, her leadership in the American Guild of Organists garnered her the organization's Edward A. Hansen Leadership Award, "in recognition of her unparalleled knowledge of the King of Instruments, lifelong scholarship and publications, and devoted service to the AGO". In 2005, the Organ Historical Society published a festschrift in her honor, Literae Organi: Essays in Honor of Barbara Owen.

A collection of nineteenth-century hymnals donated by Owen is owned by the School of Theology Library at Boston University. Owen versified or wrote a number of hymn texts.

=== Personal life ===
Owen died at Masconomet Healthcare in Topsfield, where she was a patient after breaking her hip, on October 14, 2024, at the age of 91.

== Publications ==
- The Organ in New England, Sunbury Press, ISBN 978-0-915548-08-8, 1979.
- The Organ Music of Johannes Brahms, Oxford University Press, ISBN 978-0-19-531107-5, 2007.
- Pioneers in American Organ Music 1860–1920: The New England Classicists, The Leupold Foundation, ISBN 978-1-881162-75-9, 2021.
