= Darol Froman =

American physicist (1906–1997)

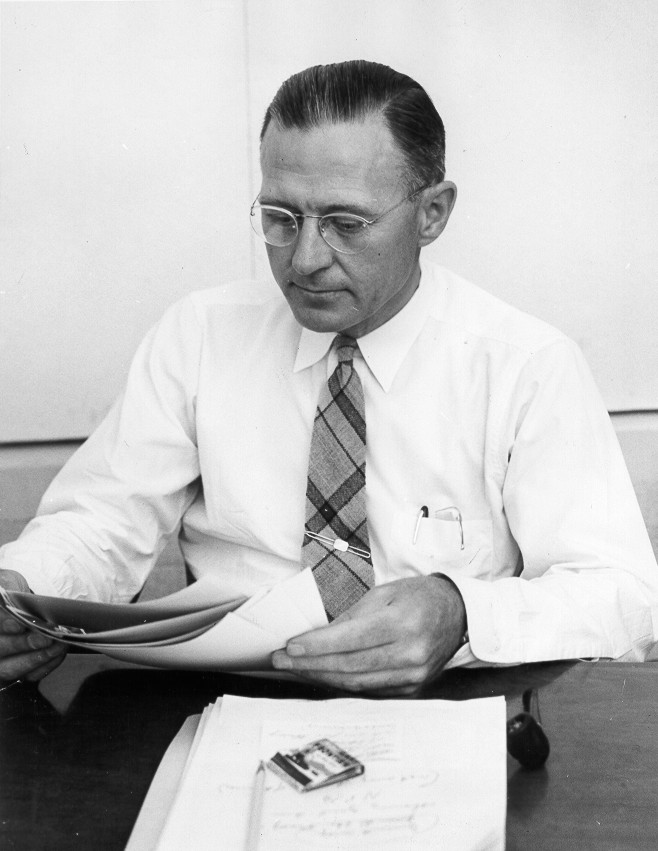
- Dr. Darol K. Froman, Technical Associate Director, Los Alamos Scientific Laboratory in 1953
- Born: Darol Kenneth Froman; October 23, 1906; Harrington, Washington, US
- Died: September 11, 1997 (aged 90); Santa Fe, New Mexico, US
- Education: University of Alberta (B.Sc. 1926, M.Sc. 1927); University of Chicago (Ph.D. 1930)
- Known for: Deputy Director of Los Alamos Laboratory
- Awards: a wide range of patents for electrical components and batteries
- Scientific career
- Fields: Nuclear physics
- Workplaces: Los Alamos National Laboratory
- Thesis: A photographic method of determining atomic structure factors (1930)
- Doctoral advisor: Arthur Compton

Darol Kenneth Froman (October 23, 1906 – September 11, 1997) was an American physicist who served as the deputy director of the Los Alamos National Laboratory from 1951 to 1962. He served as a group leader from 1943 to 1945, and a division head from 1945 to 1948. He was the scientific director of the Operation Sandstone nuclear tests at Enewetak Atoll in the Pacific in 1948, and assistant director for weapons development from 1949 to 1951.

== Early life ==
Darol Kenneth Froman was born in Harrington, Washington, on October 23, 1906, the son of a farmer. His family moved to Canada in 1910. He entered the University of Alberta in Edmonton, which awarded him the degrees of Bachelor of Science (B.Sc.) in 1926 and Master of Science (M.Sc.) the following year.

He was a summer student at the University of Chicago in 1926 and 1927 before enrolling as a graduate student in 1928. He completed his Doctor of Philosophy (Ph.D.) thesis there on A Photographic Method of Determining Atomic Structure Factors in 1930, under the supervision of Arthur Compton. It was subsequently published in the Physical Review.

After graduating from the University of Chicago, Froman became a lecturer at the University of Alberta from 1930 to 1931, and was lecturer and assistant professor of physics at Macdonald College at McGill University in Montreal from 1931 to 1939. During the summer months he joined Joyce C. Stearns at Mount Blue Sky or Echo Lake Park to study cosmic rays.

== World War II ==
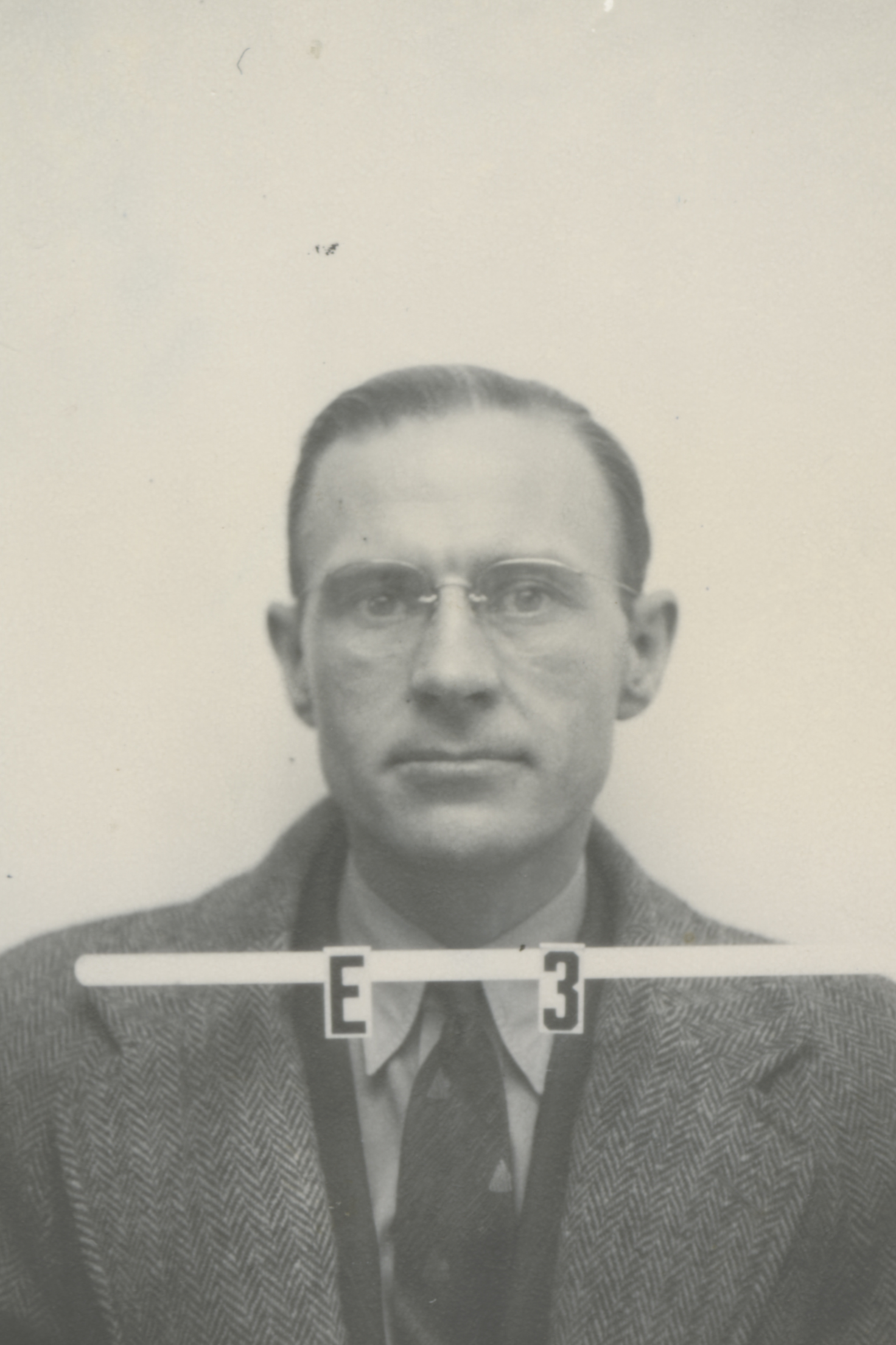
Darol Froman's Los Alamos badge

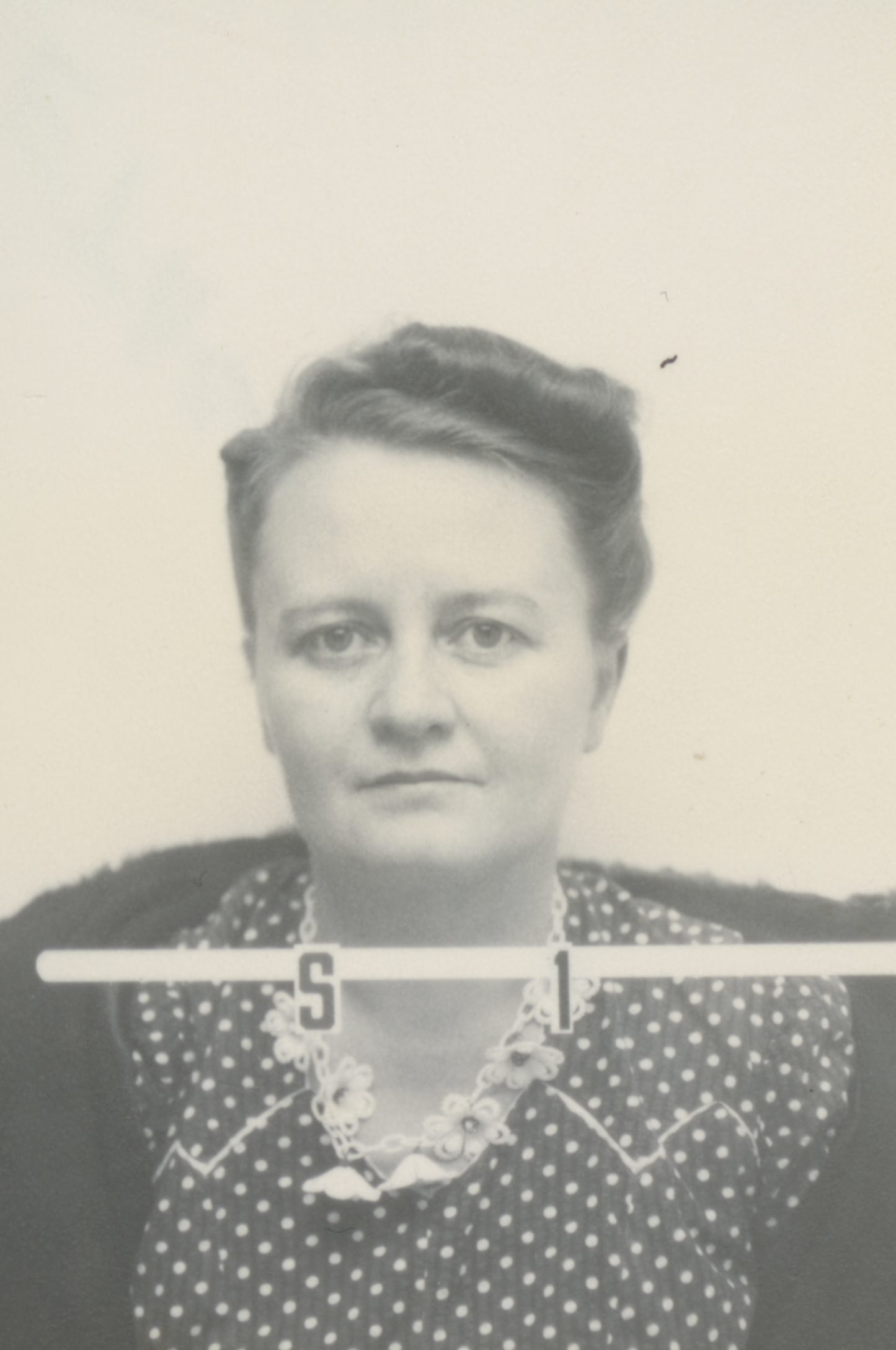
Ethel Froman's Los Alamos badge

After the outbreak of World War II in 1939, Froman joined the McGill group working on radar and waveguides. In 1941, he became head of the Mount Evans High Altitude Laboratory, working on cosmic ray research, and taught physics at the University of Denver from 1941 to 1942. He joined the Navy Radio and Sound Laboratory in 1942.

Later that year Froman joined the Manhattan Project's Metallurgical Laboratory at the University of Chicago, where he witnessed the start up of Chicago Pile-1, the world's first nuclear reactor, in December 1942. He was one of the earliest arrivals at the Manhattan Project's Los Alamos Laboratory in New Mexico, where he was head of the P-4 (Electronic) Group in Robert Bacher's P (Physics) Division. When the Laboratory was reorganized to concentrate on an implosion-type nuclear weapon in August 1944, he became head of the G-4 (Electric Method) Group in Bacher's G (Gadget) Division.

His wife, Ethel N. Froman, worked as a support staff at Los Alamos during the Manhattan Project.

== Later life ==
Froman remained at Los Alamos after the war, replacing Bacher as head of G Division (now renamed M Division) in 1945. In 1948, he was the scientific director of the Operation Sandstone nuclear tests at Enewetak Atoll in the Pacific. He was assistant director for weapons development from 1949 to 1951. He served as the associate technical director, later renamed deputy director, from 1951 until he retired in 1962. As such he was second only to the director of the Los Alamos National Laboratory, Norris E. Bradbury, and he worked closely with Bradbury, Edward Teller and Stanislaw Ulam on the design of the hydrogen bomb. He was also heavily involved with Project Rover, the project to develop a nuclear thermal rocket.

Froman became a consultant professor for the University of New Mexico in 1947. He was also chairman of the board for First National Bank of Rio Arriba, scientific director of Douglas Aircraft, director of development for Espanola Hospital, and a member of the Science Advisory Committee on Ballistic Missiles for the Secretary of Defense. He was a fellow of the American Physical Society and American Nuclear Society and a member of the New York Academy of Sciences and the Association of Los Alamos Scientists. He was awarded an honorary degree of Doctor of Laws (LL.D.) by the University of Alberta in 1964. Froman was married with two daughters, Kay and Eva. He died in Santa Fe, New Mexico on September 11, 1997.

In 2009, Danny B. Stillman, a former head of intelligence at the Los Alamos National Laboratory, and Thomas C. Reed, a weapons designer at the Lawrence Livermore National Laboratory and a Secretary of the Air Force, published a book titled The Nuclear Express, in which they presented unsubstantiated allegations that an unnamed American scientist, easily identified as Froman, was a KGB spy who gave the Teller-Ulam design to the Soviet Union. "The allegation that Froman was a spy", noted Robert Norris, "is likely to come as surprise to his colleagues and to many others". In a review of Nuclear Express, Norris, Jeremy Bernstein and Peter Zimmerman concluded that it "is an unreliable, often wrong, history of the proliferation of nuclear weapons".
