= Salamo Airport =

Airport in Salamo, Milne Bay, Papua New Guinea

- IATA: SAM; ICAO: none

Summary
- Location: Salamo, Papua New Guinea
- Elevation AMSL: 50 ft / 15 m
- Coordinates: 9°40′16.8″S 150°47′21″E

Map
- Location of airport in Papua New Guinea

Runways
Direction	Length		Surface
Direction	m	ft	Surface
14/32	930	3,051
- Source: PNG Airstrip Guide

Salamo Airport is an airfield serving Salamo, in the Milne Bay Province of Papua New Guinea.

== Airlines and destinations ==
The airfield can be reached by chartered (unscheduled) flights from nearby airstrips with Airlines PNG and other Papua new Guinean charter airlines.
