= Mark Lindley =

- Born: 11 February 1937 (age 89); Washington D.C., U.S.

Academic background
- Education: Harvard University; Columbia University; Juilliard School of Music

Mark Lindley (born 11 February 1937) is a musicologist, historian of modern India, and a teacher of economics.

Born in Washington, D.C., he studied at Harvard University (A.B.), the Juilliard School of Music (M.S.) and Columbia University (D. Phil.). He has taught at Columbia University, City University of New York, Washington University, University of London, Oxford University, University of Regensburg, Chinese University of Hong Kong, University of Kerala, Istanbul Technical University, Yildiz Technical University, Bogaziçi University, and the University of Hyderabad, where he served in 2015 as the University Chair professor in the School of Economics. He has also lectured on economics at Gujarat Vidyapith, at Dr. Babasaheb Ambedkar Marathwada University and at the Gokhale Institute of Politics and Economics. He has held research fellowships at the Gandhi Research Foundation, and was a visiting professor in 2016 at the University of Zaragoza and in 2017 at the Central University of Gujarat. He serves now as "Professor of Eminence" (in the fields of ecological economics, Gandhian thought, and Western classical music) at The MGM University in Aurangabad.

Lindley has identified himself as an atheist.

== Works ==
Bibliography of Books Read by Mahatma Gandhi, with Kirit K. Bhavsar and Purnima Upadhyay (Gujarat Vidyapith University, Ahmedabad, 2011).

Gustav Le Bon (1841-1931), Ferdinand Tönnies (1855-1936) and Mahatma Gandhi (1869-1948) as Modern Psychologists (Mahatma Gandhi Mission, Aurangabad, 2018; 2nd ed., 2020).

“A Comprehensive Sketch of What Mahatma Gandhi Said and Did re: Health, Nutrition, Hygiene and Health Care” (lecture delivered in 2019 in New Delhi to a joint meeting of the All India Institute of Medical Sciences and the Indian Council of Medical Research)

An Account of the Historic Dialogue between Mahatma Gandhi and Babasaheb Ambedkar (with a preface by Ankushrao N. Kadam; Mahatma Gandhi Mission University, Aurangabad, 2020)

Looking Back for Insights into a New Paradigm, with James Farmelant. MRZine.

The Strange Case of Dr. Hayek and Mr. Hayek, with James Farmelant (in Journal of Social and Political Studies, Allahabad, vol.3/2, 2012).

Some Historical Notes on Ecological Sensibilities in Modern Western Culture (University of Kerala, Trivandrum, 2016; revised 2020).

A Proposal to Establish at the MGM University a Potentially Notable Ph.D. Programme in Ecological Economics (Mahatma Gandhi University, Aurangabad, 2020).

How About a UBI Funded by Levies on Every Way of Destroying our Heritage of Natural Resources? (lecture delivered in 2019 at the University of Hyderabad; published subsequently by Mahatma Gandhi University, Aurangabad, with a foreword by Herman Daly).

Universal Basic Income in India too? A Dialogue (with Pulin B. Nayak; in Mainstream, vol. LVIII/50, 2020)

Pastoralism and Gandhi's Village-ism; guest lecture, Mahatma Gandhi University, 2022.

"Valuable nuances of tuning for part 1 of J. S. Bach's Das wohl temperirte Clavier", Berlin SIMPK 2011

An Instructive Glimpse into Relations between Some 20th-century US Journalists and Presidents (Mahatma Gandhi Mission University, Aurangabad, 2020).

“Some Disturbances to Mental Health During What Gandhi Might have Reckoned to be the Last ‘Day’ of Modern Western Culture as a ‘Nine-Days Wonder’” (lecture delivered at Savitribai Phule Pune University in 2019 and subsequently published by Mahatma Gandhi University).

“Some Ideas for How Social Workers Can Make Use of Gandhi's Heritage (while ignoring his utopianism)” (lecture delivered at the University of Delhi in 2020 and subsequently published by Mahatma Gandhi University).

“Anja Bohnhof and India” (lecture delivered in 2019 at the National Gandhi Museum, inaugurating an exhibition there, and subsequently published by Mahatma Gandhi University).

Lutes, Viols, Temperaments (Cambridge University Press, 1984)
