= Stop action magnet =

Electromagnetic device in pipe organs

The stop action magnet, usually abbreviated to SAM, is an electromagnetic device used for the control of pipe organs and virtual pipe organs, and forms part of the organ's combination action. On a classical organ the device may be referred to as a drawstop solenoid. The SAM can be considered an electrical relay, the difference being that the SAM also has a drawknob or a tab, which enables it to be operated manually as well as electrically.

A SAM will have an armature which is operated by an electrically induced magnetic field and dependent on whether the SAM is being used with a drawknob or a tilting tablet on a classically voiced organ or with a flat tab on a theatre organ, the armature will move in either a linear fashion or with semi-circular movement, in a small defined arc. A drawknob or tab is attached to the armature to facilitate hand operation.

Each SAM consists of two coils of wire, wound on bobbins, which surround a single central, magnetically conductive pole piece or two separate pole pieces (determined by the designer) and will have one or more switching contacts or reed switches that are switched on or off by the movement of the armature. The switching contact is used to control which rank or ranks of pipes will sound when keys on a keyboard are depressed, although the actual 'rank switching' is often handled by a more complex electromagnetic or electronic relay system.

In mechanical operation using a SAM with a drawknob attached, a player will either pull the drawknob towards themselves to select an 'on' state, or push the drawknob away to select an 'off' state. The movement of the drawknob affects the state of the switch or reed contact. Similarly, with a SAM that utilises a tilting tablet, the player will tilt the tablet up or down by hand to operate it. With a theatre organ the tab attached to each SAM is raised or lowered by the player to operate the switch contact/s.

Whilst hand registering the organ is often carried out, this can only be used to facilitate small changes in the overall tonal colour, due to physical restrictions. i.e. The operator cannot operate more than one or two devices simultaneously, especially when using only one hand for registration, whilst playing keys with the other hand! This is where the true versatility of the SAM comes into play. By applying a low voltage electric current (usually between 12 and 30 volts at up to 0.5 ampere) to one or the other of a SAM's electromagnets (coils) the armature can be made to follow the same movement and thus operate its switching contact/s as if it had been actuated by a human operator. The advantage of electrical operation being that many SAMs can be electrically connected together and switched by the use of a single button (piston) depressed by the human player using only one finger. It can therefore be seen that operating many SAMs in simultaneous combination will have a far greater instantaneous effect on the sound of the organ (which is essential for tonal variety) than is achievable by the use of single SAMs. Furthermore, combinations of registration changes can be stored in electronic or electromechanical memory which forms part of the organ's combination action, for instant recall at the touch of a button (piston) and translated into electrical impulses used to operate multiple SAMs.

One further use of SAMs in multiples is to achieve instant cancellation of organ registrations either in banks or for the entire organ. Most organs will have a General Cancel button for the purpose of entire cancellation, whilst at least one style of pipe organ manufactured by the John Compton company in the 20th century uses an ingenious system known as Second Touch Cancel, where each SAM has an extra contact fitted which is operated by depressing any single SAM's tab past its normal 'on' position, and which serves to switch all associated SAMs in its department to the 'off' position.

== External references ==
- Syndyne Corporation
- Kimber Allen UK Ltd
