= Noack Organ Company =

Pipe organ manufacturer in Massachusetts, United States

Noack Organ Company

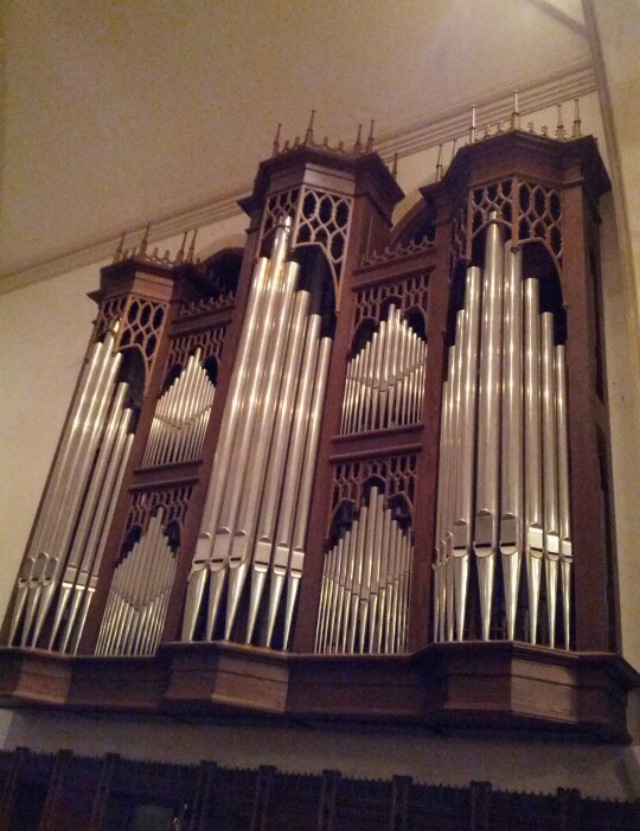
Noack organ at Church of the Incarnation (Dallas, Texas)

The Noack Organ Company is a pipe organ manufacturer based out of Georgetown, Massachusetts.

Fritz Noack began the company in 1960 in Lawrence, Massachusetts. Prior to that he had worked with a number of organ builders in Europe and the United States. He would later move his firm to Andover before moving to Georgetown in 1970.

The company has produced a number of organs throughout the United States, as well building organs in Japan and Iceland.
