= List of pipe organ builders =

This is a list of notable pipe organ builders.

== Australia ==
- William Anderson (1832–1921)
- Australian Pipe Organs Pty Ltd
- Robert Cecil Clifton (1854–1931)
- William Davidson
- J. E. Dodd & Sons Gunstar Organ Works
- Fincham & Hobday
- Geo. Fincham & Son
- Alfred Fuller (1845–1923)
- Hargraves Pipe Organs Pty Ltd
- William Hill & Son & Norman & Beard Ltd (Australian subsidiary)
- Peter D. G. Jewkes Pty Ltd
- Johnson & Kinloch
- Samuel Joscelyne
- Carl Krüger (1802–1871)
- Ernst Ladegast (1853–1937)
- F. J. Larner & Co.
- Laurie Pipe Organs
- C. W. Leggo
- Daniel Heinrich Lemke (c. 1832–1897)
- Samuel Marshall
- Joseph Massey (1854–1943)
- James Moyle
- Pierce Pipe Organs
- Pipe Organs Victoria Pty. Ltd.
- Pitchford & Garside
- Roger Pogson
- Charles Richardson (1847–1926)
- William Leopold Roberts (died 1971), built "Memorial Organ" (1924–1961) for St Andrew's Church, Brighton
- Ronald Sharp (1929–2021)
- Knud Smenge
- Frederick Taylor
- Wakeley Pipe Organs Pty Ltd

== Austria ==
- Matthäus Abbrederis (1652 – c. 1725)
- Orgelbau Pieringer
- Rieger Orgelbau

== Belgium ==
- Georges Cloetens (1871–1949)
- Forceville – Antwerp
- Johannes Thomas Forceville (1696–1750)
- Matthijs Langhedul (?–1636)
- Mortier – Antwerp
- Jan Lapon – Diksmuide

== Canada ==
- Casavant Frères (Joseph Casavant) – Saint-Hyacinthe, Québec
- Legge Organ Co. Ltd – Toronto, Ontario
- Gabriel Kney – London, Ontario
- Guilbault-Thérien – Saint-Hyacinthe, Québec
- Louis Mitchell – Quebec
- Orgues Létourneau – Saint-Hyacinthe, Québec
- Laliberté-Payment – Repentigny, Québec
- Karl Wilhelm – Mont-Saint-Hilaire, Québec
- Hellmuth Wolff, Wolff & Associés – Laval, Québec
- R. A. Denton & Son – Hamilton, Ontario
- Juget-Sinclair – Montréal, Québec

== Cuba ==
- Hermanos Cuayo (Fábricantes de Órganos, Holguin)

== Czech Republic ==
- Rieger-Kloss

== Czechoslovakia ==
- Rieger-Kloss

== Denmark ==
- Poul-Gerhard Andersen (1904–1980)
- Frobenius Orgelbyggeri
- Marcussen & Søn

== France ==
- Alexandre
- Charles S. Barker
- Quentin Blumenroeder
- Daublaine & Callinet
- Aristide Cavaillé-Coll
- Joseph Merklin
- Charles Mutin
- Puget Family
- Dom Bédos de Celles (1709–1779)
- François-Henri Clicquot
- Robert Clicquot
- Charles Lefebvre (1670–1737)
- Clément Lefebvre (1630–1709)
- Jean-Baptiste Nicolas Lefebvre (1705–1784)
- Louis-Charles Lefebvre (1708–1754)
- Koenig
- Claude Parisot
- Georges Danion
- Victor Gonzalez
- Jean-Loup and Robert Boisseau
- Bertrand Cattiaux
- Pascal Quoirin

== Germany ==
- Jürgen Ahrend – Leer, Lower Saxony
- Michael Becker Orgelbau
- Rudolf von Beckerath (1907–1976)
- Peter Breisiger (1516–1542)
- Hayl family of organ builders, 16th and 17th century family of pipe organ builders
- Zacharias Hildebrandt (1688–1757)
- Albertus Antonius Hinsz (1704–1785)
- Hofbauer – Göttingen
- Elias Hößler (1663–1746)
- Stephan Kaschendorf (c. 1425–c. 1499)
- Emanuel Kemper, Lübeck
- Orgelbau Klais (Johannes Klais Orgelbau GmbH & Co. KG) – Bonn, North Rhine-Westphalia
- Friedrich Krebs (?–1493)
- Friedrich Ladegast (1818–1905) – Weissenfels
- Orgelbau Mebold, Siegen
- Johann Josua Mosengel (1663–1731)
- Arp Schnitger (1648–1719)
- Schuke family, three generations, two workshops, one in Potsdam (1884), named Alexander Schuke Potsdam Orgelbau in 1990 and located from 2004 in Werder (Havel), the other in Berlin (1953), Karl Schuke Berliner Orgelbauwerkstatt
- Gottfried Silbermann (1683–1753)
- Christian Gottlob Steinmüller (1792–1864)
- Georg Christoph Stertzing (c. 1650–1717)
- Tobias Heinrich Gottfried Trost (c. 1679–1759)
- Heinrich Traxdorf (built organs in the mid-15th century)
- Orgelbau Vleugels (Orgelbau Vleugels GmbH) – Hardheim, Baden-Wuerttemberg
- Walcker Orgelbau (E. F. Walcker Orgelbau) – Ludwigsburg, Baden-Württemberg
- M. Welte & Sons – Freiburg im Breisgau, Baden-Württemberg
- Johann Friedrich Wender (1655–1729) – Mühlhausen
- Paul Voelkner (Pipe organ builder), Eastern Pomerania
- Glatter-Götz Orgelbau – Pfullendorf Germany
- Wolkenstayn Orgelbau – Kötz, Germany

== Hungary ==
- Aquincum Organbuilder Company
- Pécs Organ Manufactory

== Ireland ==
- Trevor Crowe
- Kenneth Jones and Associates (1979–present) – Kilcoole, County Wicklow
- Neiland & Creane Organ Builders (1990–present) – Wexford

== Italy ==
- Agati
- Antegnati – Brescia
- Bossi – Italian firm of organ builders originally from Mendrisio (Canton Ticino)
- CHICHI Organi – Florence
- Consoli Pipe Organs, Locorotondo, Bari, Apulia
- Lorenzo Musante − Genoa
- Mascioni – Cuvio (Varese)
- Organi Pinchi, Trevi, Umbria
- Giovanni Pradella – Sondrio
- Fratelli Ruffatti – Padua
- Tamburini − Crema, Lombardy

== Netherlands ==
- Andries van Bolder, Arnhem (died 1763)
- Johann Heinrich Hartmann Bätz, Utrecht (1709–1770)
- De Gebroeders Adema, Hillegom
- Duyschot, Holland
- Flentrop, Zaandam
- Hendrik Niehoff (1495–1561)
- J. L. van den Heuvel Orgelbouw, Dordrecht
- Rodensteen family (also given as Raphaëlis, Rottstein, and Rottenstein-Pock), 15th century Dutch family of organ builders
- Pels & van Leeuwen, Rosmalen
- Reil, Heerde
- Van Dam, Leeuwarden
- Matthijs van Deventer, Gendt
- Van Vulpen, Utrecht
- Christian Gottlieb Friedrich Witte, Utrecht
- Johan Frederik Witte, Utrecht

== New Zealand ==
- South Island Organ Company

== Poland ==
- Cepka Marek
- Drozdowicz Jan
- Jakubowski Mirosław
- Kamińscy
- Mollin Zdzisław
- Nawrot Marian
- Olejnik Adam
- Jan Śliwiński (organmistrz) (finished)
- Truszczyński Włodzimierz (finished)
- Zych – Zakłady Organowe (the biggest Polish organbuilder)

== Portugal ==
- António Xavier Machado e Cerveira

== Slovenia ==
- Skrabl (Škrabl) –
- Orglarstvo Mocnik (Močnik) –

== South Africa ==
- R Muller – Potchestroom
- van Schalkwyk Organ Builders – Cape Town & Surrounding areas
- SAOB (South African Organ Builders / Suid Afrikaanse Orrel Bouers) – Pretoria (Now Defunct)
- Cooper Gill & Tomkins – Cape Town
- Pekelharing Organ Building – Port Elizabeth
- Protea Orrelbouers – Brandfort
- Jan Zielman Orrelbouers – Pretoria
- Pyporrels (Werner Hurter) – Pretoria
- AA Tod Organ Builders Cc (Johannesburg)

== Spain ==
- Blancafort, OM.
- Gerhard Grenzing
- Lope Alberdi Ricalde (1869–1948)
- Federico Acitores, Acitores Organería y Arte S.L.
- Jordi Bosch
- Rafael Puignau (1888-1979)

== Sweden ==
Here are a few of the organ builders in Sweden. See the category "Swedish pipe organ builders" for more.

- Åkerman & Lund Orgelbyggeri
- Johan Niclas Cahman
- Grönlunds Orgelbyggeri
- Hammarbergs Orgelbyggeri
- A. Magnusson Orgelbyggeri AB
- Sven and Erik Nordström
- Setterquist & Son Orgelbyggeri
- Walter Thür Organbuilders

== Switzerland ==
- Friedrich Haas
- Orgelbau Thomas Wälti – Gümligen
- Orgelbau Kuhn AG – Männedorf
- Metzler Orgelbau – Dietikon
- Mathis Orgelbau – Näfels
- Orgelbau Goll – Luzern
- Späth Orgelbau – Rüti, Zürich
- Orgelbau Graf – Oberkirch
- Orgelbau Roman Steiner – Fehren
- Orgelbau Felsberg – Felsberg
- Manufacture d'Orgues Füglister – Grimisuat
- Erni Orgelbau – Stans
- Peter Meier Orgelbau – Rheinfelden
- Lifart Orgelbau AG – Emmen
- Flayer Manufacture d'Orgues – Ursy
- Arno Caluori Orgelbau – Seewis
- Armin Hauser Orgelbau – Kleindöttingen
- Orgelbau Stemmer – Zumikon
- Manufacture d'orgues St. Martin S.A. Chézard-Saint-Martin

== Turkey ==
- Istanbul Pipe Organ Team (?-present) – Istanbul

== United Kingdom ==
=== Current (post-2016) ===
- Balfour-Rowley Ltd. Organ Builders (2016–present) – Worksop
- Benson George Bristol 1881- 1911 built Organs in primitive methodist churches around the city - mainly demolished. Appears in Arrowsmith Directory of Bristol 1906.
- Bishop & Sons (1795–present) – London and Ipswich
- W & A Boggis (1932–present) – Roydon, South Norfolk
- F. Booth & Son Ltd. (1951–present) – Stanningley, West Yorkshire
- Bower & Company (1972–present) – Wroxham, Norfolk
- F. H. Browne & Sons (1870–present) – Canterbury, Kent.
  - From 1 October 2020 the company trades under the name of Mander Organs.
- A. J. Carter Organ Builder Ltd. (1984–present) – Stanley, West Yorkshire
- Clevedon Organ group (Clevedon Organs (UK) Ltd & Clevedon Pipe Organ Services, incorporating Daniel & Co Ltd (Clevedon) and Cawston Organs Ltd.)
- Vincent Coggin Organ Builder (c.1980–present) – Terrington St Clement, Norfolk
- Cooper & Co. Organ Builders (2011–present) – Ryde
- Cousans Organs (1877–present) – formerly Lincoln now Leicester
- Percy Daniel & Co (c.1919–present) – Clevedon
- Dean Organ Builders (1970–present) (Bristol, England)
- William Drake (1974–present) – Buckfastleigh, Devon
- Duplex Pipe Organ and Blower Company (2001–present) – Farnham, Surrey
- Forth Pipe Organs Limited (2002–present) – Rosyth, Fife
- Lance Foy Organs (?-present) – Truro, Cornwall
- Martin Goetze and Dominic Gwynn Ltd (1980–present) – formerly Northampton, now Welbeck, Nottinghamshire
- Henry Groves & Son Ltd (1957–present) – Nottingham
- Norman Hall & Sons (c.1969–present) – Cambridge, Cambridgeshire
- Harrison and Harrison Ltd (1861–present) – Durham, County Durham
- Holmes and Swift Organ Builders (c.1979–present) – Fakenham, Norfolk
- Charles James Organs (2004–present) – Ashwell, Rutland
- Jardine Organ Builders, (1846–present) – Stretford, Manchester
- Jennings Organs (1989–present) – Cranham Chase, Dorset
- E. J. Johnson & Son (Cambridge) Ltd. (c.1955–present) – Snetterton, Norfolk
- Peter Jones Organ Builder (1979–present) – St John's, Isle of Man
- Lammermuir Pipe Organs (1983–present) – Oldhamstocks, East Lothian
- Jonathan Lane & Associates Ltd. (2006–present) – Epsom, Surrey
- Michael Macdonald Organ Builder (1975–present) – Simshill, Glasgow
- Midland Organ, Hele & Co. Ltd (1860–present) – Burton Lazars, Leicestershire
- T. R. Moore Ltd (2017–present) – Nottingham
- Nicholson & Co (Worcester) Ltd (1841–present) – Malvern, Worcestershire
- Gary Owens Organ Builders (2001–present) – Pontypool
- Pennine Organ Services (?-present) – Barnsley, South Yorkshire.
- Pipe Organ Preservation Co. (1999–present) – Belfast
- Pipe Organ Services Ltd. (c.1985–present)- formerly Salisbury, and since 1996 Saxby, Melton Mowbray.
- Positive Organ Company Ltd (2020–present) – Brackley, Northamptonshire
- Principal Pipe Organs (1983–present) – York, North Yorkshire
- D. Roberts Organ Builders Ltd (2003–present) – Seaham Harbour, Durham
- Sheppard & Cross Pipe Organ Services Ltd (2017–present) – Uckfield, Sussex
- B. C. Shepherd & Sons Organ Builders (1927–present) – Edgware
- David Shuker | At the Sign of the Pipe (2009–present) – Birling, Kent
- George Sixsmith & Son Ltd. (1955–present) – Mossley, Greater Manchester
- Soundcraft Pipe Organ Company (2016–present) – Northampton, Northamptonshire
- Peter Spencer Ltd (1997–present) – Bubbenhall, Warwickshire
- J. M. Spink (c.1970–present) – Leeds, West Yorkshire
- The Village Workshop (c.1994–present) – Finchingfield
- J. W. Walker & Sons Ltd (1828–present) – Brandon, Suffolk
- David Wells Organ Builders Ltd (1981–present) – Liverpool
- Wells-Kennedy Partnership (1966–present) – Lisburn
- Henry Willis & Sons Ltd; (1845–present) – variously, London, Petersfield and Liverpool
- Wood Pipe Organ Builders (1966–present) – Huddersfield

=== Defunct ===
- Abbott and Smith (1869–1964) – Leeds
- Arnold Moseley (1856 -1939) Wolverhampton. Mainly Congregational Chapels in the area.
- Cedric Arnold (1927-1961) - Chelmsford then Thaxted
- Cedric Arnold, Williamson & Hyatt (1961-1973) - Thaxted
- Theodore Charles Bates and Sons (c. 1812–c. 1864) – Ludgate Hill, London
- G. Bedwell & Son (1871–1946) – Cambridge
- Henry Bevington (1794–?) – London
- James Jepson Binns – Leeds, Yorkshire
- Bishop & Starr - London
- Blackett & Howden (c.1890-1970)
- Richard Bridge (?–before 1766) – London
- Brindley & Foster (1871–1939) – Sheffield, Yorkshire
- Cambridge Organ Company (?–?)
- Kenneth Canter (Thurston, Suffolk)
- Messrs Casey & Cairney (?–c.1971?) – Glasgow
- Casson's Patent Organ Co Ltd. (1887–95), thereafter trading as Mitchell and Thynne.- Denbigh and London.
- Nigel Church Organs Ltd. (1971–1997) – Stamfordham, Northumberland
- A. J. Claypole (1914–1936) – located on Narrow St. Peterborough
- James Cole [a.k.a. James Cole & Son, Cole & Duckworth, Jas. Y. Duckworth (Late Cole & Son)] (fl.1855–88) – Manchester
- Peter Collins (1964–2017) – Melton Mowbray, Leicestershire
- John Compton (1865–1957)
- Conacher and Co. (1854–1986) – Huddersfield
- David Coram (?–2019) – Fordingbridge, Hampshire
- Martin Cross Organ Builder (1969–2017) – Stifford, near Grays, Essex
- Thomas Dallam (159? - 167?) and his sons, Robert, Ralph and George - London.
- Degens & Rippin Ltd (1960–64) – London
- Driver & Haigh (1882 -1969) – Bradford
- East Midlands Organ Company (?–?)
- Thomas Elliott (1790–1825) – London
- Elliott and Hill (1825–32) – London
- Forster and Andrews (1845–1956) – variously Hull, London, York
- August Gern (1866–1938) – London
- S. E. Gilks (?1950–?1976) – Peterborough
- Gray & Davison (1841–1973) – London
- Grant, Degens & Rippin (1964–66) – London
- Grant, Degens & Bradbeer (1967–1981) – London, then Northampton
- J Halmshaw & Sons (1842–1913) – Dewsbury, Yorkshire (to 1849), Birmingham, Warwickshire (1849-1913). Merged with Ebrall in 1913, when Joseph William Halmshaw (1868-1941) was listed as Manager. He was listed as Retired Organ Builder in the 1939 registration.
- Renatus Harris (son of Thomas Harris and father of John Harris) (c. 1652–1724)
- William Hedgeland (1851-c.1891; merged with Bishop & Sons) – Paddington, London
- Hele & Co (1865–2017) – Truro, then Plymouth
- William Hill & Sons Ltd (1832–1916) – London
- William Hill & Son & Norman & Beard Ltd. (1916–98) – London
- Robert Hope-Jones (1851–1914)
- A. Hunter & Son (1856–1937) – Clapham
- R. Huntingford (?- early c20) – location unknown
- Kenneth James and Sons Ltd (c.1970–90) – location unknown.
- T. S. Jones (?-?) – London
- Ernest Lifford & Co. (1914–1940) – Yeovil
- Henry Cephas Lincoln (fl. 1810–55) – London
- John Lincoln (fl.1789–1820) – London
- Lewis & Co (1860–1919) – Brixton, London Borough of Lambeth
- Charles Lloyd – Nottingham, Nottinghamshire
- C. F. Lloyd (son of Charles Lloyd) – Nottingham, Nottinghamshire
- Longstaff & Jones (c.1970-c.2009) – Telford, West Midlands.
- John Loosemore (1616–1681) – Devon
- W.C. Mack (fl. 1854-99) – Great Yarmouth.
- Mander Organs Ltd (1936–2020) – London.
  - In July 2020 the company went into liquidation. The company name and intellectual property were acquired by F. H. Browne and Sons Ltd (of Canterbury) with that firm trading as Mander Organs from 1 October 2020.
- J. E. Minns (1879–1895) – Taunton. Company purchased by George Osmond.
- Norman and Beard Ltd (1870–1916) – London
- Geo. Osmond & Co. (1895–1988) – Taunton. Succeeded J. E. Minns and traded under that name until 1908.
- Albert E. Pease (1890–1909) – Stoke Newington, London
- The Positive Organ Company Ltd. (1898–1941) – London.
- Roger Pulham (fl. 1970–2010) – Woodbridge, Suffolk.
- Rushworth and Dreaper – Liverpool, Merseyside
- Bernard Schmidt ("Father Smith") (c. 1630–1708)
- George Sherborne (c.1800–1862) – Bath
- John Snetzler (fl. 1741–1781) – London
- A.E. & F. A. Still (?-?) – location?
- Thomas Swarbrick (fl. 1705/6-c.1753) – London then Warwick
- William Sweetland (fl. 1849–c.1900) – Bath, Somerset; thereafter Sweetland Organ Building Co. Ltd.
- Kenneth Tickell & Company (1982–2020) – Wellingborough.
- Trevor Tipple (fl. 1978–2015) – Worcester.
- H. S. Vincent & Co. – Sunderland
- W. G. Vowles (1856–1958) – Bristol
- Andrew Watt & Son (?-1965) – Glasgow
- Peter Wells Organ Builders (1974–2015) – Cranbrook, Kent
- Williamson & Hyatt (1950-1961) - Trunch
- Samuel Wort (fl. 1916–38) – 1/. Holloway, 2/. Camden Town, London.
- E. Wragg & Son (1894–1969) – Nottingham, Nottinghamshire
- Alexander Young & Sons (1872–1927) – Manchester

== United States ==
See Organ Historical Society's Pipe Organ Database for nearly complete list, current and historical.

- Abbott and Sieker, Los Angeles, California
- Aeolian Company, Garwood, New Jersey (organ production 1887-1932, after which it merged with the Skinner Organ Company)
- Aeolian-Skinner Organ Company, Boston, Massachusetts (1932–1972)
- A. L. White Manufacturing Company
- Joseph Alley, Newburyport, Massachusetts (1804–1880)
- Andover Organ Company, Lawrence, Massachusetts
- Alvinza Andrews, Waterville, New York (1834-1854); Sangerville, New York (1854–1862)
- Thomas Appleton, Reading, Massachusetts (1785–1872)
- Austin Organs, Inc., Hartford, Connecticut
- Balcom and Vaughan, Seattle, Washington
- Barton Organ Company, Oshkosh, Wisconsin
- Bedient Pipe Organ Company, Lincoln, Nebraska
- Berghaus Pipe Organs, Bellwood, Illinois
- Bigelow & Company, American Fork, Utah
- Buzard Pipe Organ Builders, Champaign, Illinois (1985–)
- GM Buck Pipe Organs, Lowell, Michigan
- John Brombaugh & Associates, Eugene, Oregon
- Dobson Pipe Organ Builders, Lake City, Iowa
- E. and G. G. Hook & Hastings, Boston, Massachusetts
- Henry Erben, New York, NY (1800–1884)
- Estey Organ, Brattleboro, Vermont
- Fabry Inc. Pipe Organ Builders, Antioch, Illinois (1955– )
- Felgemaker Organ Company, Erie, Pennsylvania
- C. B. Fisk, Inc., Gloucester, Massachusetts
- Charles Brenton Fisk, C. B. Fisk, Inc.'s founder (1925–1983)
- Paul Fritts & Company Organ Builders, Tacoma, Washington
- Geneva Organ Company, Geneva, Illinois
- William M. Goodrich, Boston, Massachusetts (1777–1833)
- Goulding and Wood, Inc., Indianapolis, Indiana (1980- )
- G. Donald Harrison (1889–1956)
- Hendrickson Organ Company, St. Peter, Minnesota
- Hillgreen, Lane & Company, Alliance, Ohio
- Hinners Organ Company (1879–1942)
- Otto Hofmann (1918–2001), Austin, Texas
- Robert Hope-Jones, Elmira, New York
- Holtkamp Organ Company, Cleveland, Ohio
- Johnson Organs, Westfield, Massachusetts – first William A. Johnson Organ Company, then Johnson & Son Organ Company (c. 1871-1898)
- Thomas Johnston, Boston, Massachusetts
- Kegg Pipe Organ Builders, (Hartville, Ohio)
- Kilgen, St. Louis, Missouri
- W. W. Kimball Piano and Organ, Chicago, Illinois
- Leek Pipe Organ Company, Oberlin, Ohio (1976-2014), then Berea, Ohio (2014- )
- Levsen Organ Company, Buffalo, Iowa (1954- )
- Link Piano and Organ Company
- Los Angeles Art Organ Company, Los Angeles, California
- Charles McManis, Kansas City, Kansas (1913–2004)
- Marr and Colton, Warsaw, New York (1915–1932)
- Midmer-Losh Organ Company, Merrick, New York
- McNeely Organ Company, Waterford, Connecticut
- M.P. Moller Pipe Organ Company, Hagerstown, Maryland
- David A. Moore, North Pomfret, Vermont
- Robert Morton Organ Company, Van Nuys, California (1920s–1931)
- Muller Pipe Organ Company, Toledo, Ohio & Croton, Ohio (1919- )
- Noack Organ Company, Georgetown, Massachusetts
- Olympic Organ Builders, Seattle, Washington
- J.H. & C.S. Odell, New York City
- Organ Supply Industries, Erie, Pennsylvania
- Page Organ Company, Lima, Ohio
- Parkey OrganBuilders, Braselton, Georgia
- Parsons Pipe Organ Builders, Canandaigua, New York (1921– )
- Pasi Organ Builders, Roy, Washington
- Peragallo Pipe Organ Company, Paterson, New Jersey
- Henry Pilcher (1798–1880), Pilcher Brothers, H. Pilcher's Sons, Newark, St. Louis, Chicago, New Orleans, Louisville (to 1944)
- H. Ronald Poll & Associates, Inc., Salt Lake City, Utah (1979–2020)
- Quimby Pipe Organs, Warrensburg, Missouri
- Reuter Organ Company, Lawrence, Kansas
- Richards, Fowkes & Co., Ooltewah, Tennessee
- Schantz Organ Company, Orrville, Ohio
- A. E. Schlueter Pipe Organ Company, Lithonia, Georgia
- Schoenstein & Co., Benicia, California
- Schuelke Organ Company, Milwaukee, Wisconsin
- Ernest M. Skinner (1866–1960)
- Robert L. Sipe, Garland, Texas
- David Tannenberg (1728–1824), Lititz, Pennsylvania
- Taylor & Boody Organbuilders, Staunton, Virginia
- Tellers Organ Company, Erie, Pennsylvania
- Wanamaker Organ Shop, Philadelphia, Pennsylvania
- Wangerin Organ Company, Milwaukee, Wisconsin
- M. Welte & Sons, Inc., New York City (1832–1932)
- Wicks Organ Company, Highland, Illinois
- Rudolph Wurlitzer Company, North Tonawanda, New York (1856–1988)
- Cornel Zimmer Organ Builders, Denver, North Carolina (1992- )
