= Peter Breisiger =

German organ builder (1516–1542)

Peter Breisiger (also Briesger, Bryssiger, fl. 1516–1542, dates of birth and death unknown) was a German organ builder. He was active in the first half of the 16th century, worked in Germany and the Low Countries. Breisiger continued the progressive German tradition of the previous century (represented by Stephan Kaschendorf, Heinrich Traxdorf and others), which dealt away with the old Blockwerk organ by introducing separate divisions. He went further than that and invented several types of stops (including some compound ones). He also authored a number of writings on registration, which are considered today the most important such instructions of the 16th century and are still consulted.

Places Breisiger worked at include the Cathedral of Trier, St. Mary Assumption Parish Church (Liebfrauenkirche) in Andernach, several churches (Liebfrauenkirche, Florinskirche, the Dominican church) in Koblenz, the Dominican church in Maastricht (where Breisiger's organ was probably studied by Hendrik Niehoff), the Tongeren Basilica (Onze-Lieve-Vrouwe Basiliek) and St. Amor Church in Munsterbilzen.

== See also ==
- List of organ builders
