= Gonzalez-Danion =

Gonzalez-Danion, originally known as Gonzalez or Establissements Gonzalez, was a French firm of organ builders. Originally based in Paris, it was co-founded by Victor Gonzalez (1877–1956) and Victor Ephreme in 1921. These two were the principal leaders of the firm for its first thirty-five years. The New Grove Dictionary of Music and Musicians stated that Victor Gonzalez was "the emblematic figure of French organ building of the mid-20th century."

In 1929 Gonzalez and Ephreme were joined by Victor's son Fernand Gonzalez (1904–1940). Also working in the firm until 1936 was the organ builder Rudolf von Beckerath. The Spanish organist Ramón González de Amezúa trained as an organ builder under Gonzalez and Ephreme.

The organ builder Georges Danion took over the firm in 1956 at which point it was renamed Gonzalez-Danion. Danion studied organ building under Gonzalez, beginning in 1947 and was married to Gonzalez's granddaughter, Annik Gonzalez, who also worked at Gonzalez-Danion as an organ builder. In 1962 Danion purchased the organ company of Jacquot-Lavergne in Rambervillers and moved the Gonzalez-Danion's manufacturing to that location. The company simultaneously had its office headquarters in Brunoy. In 1988 the company's Rambervillers location was sold and that site now operates under the company Manufacture Vosgienne de Grandes Orgues which is led by Bernard Dargassies.

In 1980 Annik Gonzalez and Georges Danion had established a separate company, Manufacture Languedocienne de Grandes Orgues, in Lodève, Hérault. When the Gonzalez-Danion company was sold in 1988 they moved all their energies into this new business. Danion retired in 1998 at which point that business was taken over by Charles-Emmanuel Sarélot.

== Partial list of organs built or repaired ==
- Saint-Eustache, Paris (1932 new; rebuilt 1967)
- Reims Cathedral (1938 new)
- Chapel of Versailles (1938 new)
- Soissons Cathedral (1956 new)
- Oratoire du Louvre (1962 new)
- Chartres Cathedral (1971 new)
- La Madeleine, Paris (1971 repair)
- Beauvais Cathedral (1979 new)
