= W.C. Mack =

Organ builder in Norfolk

William Christmas Mack (13 October 1818 - 9 May 1903) was an English pipe organ maker and refurbisher in Great Yarmouth, who established his practice in 1854. Most Mack organs are located in Norfolk, and, to a lesser extent, elsewhere in East Anglia.

== Early life ==
Mack was born in Elsing in 1818, the son of Robert Mack and his wife Lydia (née Christmas), and baptised in the Wesleyan Methodist church in Reepham.

He was distantly related to the benefactor Cornelius Harley Christmas, who established the Christmas Charity, which still exists in the form of the Great Yarmouth Relief Needs Trust.

== Organ building practice ==
Early in life Mack (who had been baptised in the Wesleyan Methodist church) played the double bass in the small orchestra that led the singing in the chapel at Lyng; this was in the days before widespread use of organs in churches and, before even then, harmoniums.

On reaching adulthood, Mack moved to Yarmouth and briefly entered into business with an organ builder, Samuel Street, before setting up on his own account.

For over 50 years he was the weekly tuner of the great organ at St Nicholas's Church, Great Yarmouth; the church also had a small organ built by Mack. The great organ was destroyed during the extensive wartime damage to the church. The National Pipe Organ Register makes no reference to the Mack instrument.

As late as 1899 he was still listed as an organ builder in the Yarmouth directories. One of his last instruments, at All Saints, Catfield, also dates from 1899.

On his death, Mack's business of organ-building and pianoforte tuning was briefly carried on by his grandson, Samuel Robert St Quintin, at the same premises at 10 Blackfriars' Road. However, this did not appear to thrive, as there is no entry for St Quintin in the NPOR.

Mack's obituary in the Eastern Daily Press refers to him rebuilding the organ in Wymondham Parish Church in 1871; However, the NPOR attributes this rebuild to T.C. Lewis.

Church appointments included organist at St Mary's Church, Southtown, and St Andrew's Church, Gorleston, and choirmaster at Regent Road Free Methodist Church.

== List of organs built by Mack ==
- All Saints, Belton, Norfolk (1869). At some later stage the organ was enlarged; it has subsequently been removed.
- Binham Priory, Norfolk (1880). The Mack organ in Binham Priory was formerly in East Harling church, and was relocated by David Miller in 1981. The 1880 Mack organ replaced an electronic instrument. Prior to that, there had been an earlier organ, which the NPOR confusingly refers to as by Mack (implicitly undated) but also Norman and Beard (1895). In any event, it was moved to St Wandregesilus, Bixley, Norfolk, in 1895 (and thus the earlier Mack attribution is more likely), and was lost in the fire that totally destroyed the church in 2004.
- St Mary's, Blundeston, Suffolk (1870). The organ was restored in 1970 by W. & A. Boggis of Diss.
- St Peter’s, Brooke, Norfolk (1878). The organ was restored in 1960 by Williamson & Hyatt.
- St Peter & St Paul, Burgh Castle, Norfolk (undated). The NPOR does not record the name of the organ builder.
- All Saints, Catfield, Norfolk (1899).
- St Peter and St Paul, East Harling, Norfolk (1880). The NPOR records a suggestion that this organ was built by John Fincham for Mack, and that the latter merely installed it. In 1981 this organ was removed and replaced by the Walker 3-manual from Fr Tooth's church of St James, Hatcham. The Mack organ was then installed in Binham Priory.
- St Mary's, Gillingham, Norfolk (1867/8), to a specification by Zechariah Buck of Norwich Cathedral.
- All Saints, Great Holland, Essex (unknown). The Mack organ appears to have been replaced by one by Rest Cartwright in 1911.
- Newtown Methodist Church, Wesleyan Church, Great Yarmouth (unknown). In Mack's obituary in the EDP, this is described as the Wesleyan Church (meaning the Wesleyan Reform Union, but it has subsequently become part of the Methodist Church). The NPOR dates it as 1907, which reflects the date of the rebuilding of the church, but the organ was installed in 1912, having previously been in St John's Church. The Mack organ at St John's was replaced by a Father Willis instrument of unknown date, rebuilt by JJ Binns in 1912. Given the reference to the Mack organ in the EDP obituary, the only possible explanation is that the Methodist church had an earlier Mack organ, probably dating from the construction of the original church in 1891.
- Park Baptist Church, Great Yarmouth (unknown). The Mack organ was replaced by one by Norman and Beard in 1914.
- Regent Road Free Methodist Church, Great Yarmouth (undated). The church has closed, and, in 1993, the organ was exported to Australia and installed in St Edmund's Anglican Church, Wembley, Western Australia.
- Primitive Methodist Temple, Great Yarmouth (undated). Mack's instrument was replaced by one by Norman & Beard in 1913. The Norman & beard instrument was moved to St Peter's, Tunbridge Wells when the church was closed and demolished in the early 1970s.
- Queen's Road Methodist Church, Great Yarmouth (undated).
- St Mary's, Heacham (1864). Mack's organ replaced a barrel organ by Benjamin Flight, which was moved to All Saints, Thornham (and subsequently to South Africa). In 1939 the Mack was replaced by a 1914 R. Spurden Rutt & Co instrument.
- St Philip's, Heigham (1870). The church was demolished in 1975; the fate of the organ is unknown.
- St Andrew's, Holme Hale, Norfolk (1867 in St Peter & St Paul, Cromer, installed in Holme Hale in 1897 by Norman and Beard). This was a replacement of a rebuilt organ, dating originally to 1792.
- All Saints, Litcham, Norfolk (undated). NPOR attributes the original organ to Thomas Jones (undated).
- St Mary's, Little Bentley, Essex (undated). The NPOR attributes the organ, with some hesitation, to Henry Fincham; in any event it was sold in 1934 and its subsequent history is unknown.
- All Saints, Postwick, Norfolk (1866/67).
- St Mary's, Sedgeford, Norfolk (1862). Mack rebuilt the organ in 1893.
- St Mary's, Southtown, Norfolk (1867).
- St Edmund's, Tendring, Essex (undated). The NPOR records a 1914 organ by Hele & Co; it is possible that the EDP reference is to an earlier instrument.
- Holy Trinity and All Saints, Winterton-on-Sea, Norfolk (undated). The NPOR has a clear attribution of a 1896 instrument to Brindley & Foster, which must have replaced an earlier Mack.

The only organs outside East Anglia were one in Kent and one in Australia.

- St John the Baptist, Small Hythe, Kent (1886).
- Unusually, for an organ builder with a very local focus, a two-manual instrument was acquired in 1865 from Mack for St Paul's Anglican Church, Port Adelaide.

== Personal life ==
Mack was a volunteer in the 1st Norfolk Artillery Volunteers.

Mack was married twice: first in 1842 to Elizabeth Wright, who died in 1866, and secondly in 1870 to Mary Jane Cole, who died in 1882. There were four children of the first marriage, but none of the second. One of his sons, another William Christmas Mack, was an organ builder and worked with Mack, but he died in 1869 at the age of 19.

Mack died in 1903, aged 85, from senile decay (old age).
