= Friedrich Krebs =

Friedrich Krebs may refer to:

- Friedrich Krebs (organ builder) (died 1493), pipe organ builder
- Friedrich Krebs (artist) (c.1749–1815), fraktur artist
- Friedrich Krebs (minister) (1832–1905), first chief apostle of the New Apostolic Church
- Friedrich Krebs (mayor) (1894–1961), mayor of Frankfurt
