= Augustin Lavallée =

Jean-Baptiste Augustin Lavallée (August 22, 1816 – February 15, 1903) was a music teacher, violin maker, conductor and blacksmith in Quebec. His surname also appears as Paquet or Paquet dit Lavallée.

He was born near Verchères, Lower Canada, the son of Jean-Baptiste Paquet and Charlotte Lalu. In 1842, Lavallée married Caroline Valentine. He settled in Verchères towards the end of that year. Around 1848, he moved with his family to Saint-Hyacinthe, where he worked with pipe organ manufacturer Joseph Casavant. Lavallée also taught music and conducted the village band. In 1852, he opened an instrument repair shop. In 1865, he moved his business to Montreal. He operated in partnership with his son Charles from 1888 to 1894 as Lavallée & Fils; they are believed to have manufactured over 200 violins. Lavallée then retired and Charles took over the operation of the business.

His son Calixa became a famous pianist and composer, who wrote the music for O Canada.

He died in Montreal at the age of 86.
