= Hößler =

Hößler is a German surname. Notable people with the surname include:

- Elias Hößler (1663–1746), German pipe organ builder
- Franz Hößler (1906–1945), German SS officer at several Nazi concentration camps executed for war crimes

== See also ==
- Hosler
