= McManis =

McManis is a surname. Notable people with the surname include:

- Charles McManis (1913–2004), American pipe organ builder
- Sherrick McManis (born 1987), American football player
- Wynton McManis (born 1994), American football player

== See also ==
- McManus
