= Abbrederis =

Abbrederis is a surname. Notable people with the surname include:

- Jared Abbrederis (born 1990), American football player
- Matthäus Abbrederis (1652–c. 1725), Austrian organist and organ builder
