= Friedrich Krebs (organ builder) =

German organ builder (died 1493)

- Born: Schalkhausen, Ansbach, Franconia, Holy Roman Empire
- Died: 1493; Strasbourg, Grand Est, France
- Occupation: Organ builder
- Years active: 1471–1493

Friedrich Krebs (died 1493) was an early German organ builder. He was born in Schalkhausen, a small village near Ansbach, and worked in Franconia from about 1471. He was one of several important German organ builders of the time who contributed to the transition from the gothic Blockwerk organ to organs with several divisions and independent stops. He also extended the range of keyboards and pedalboards from B to f" to F to a" (manuals) and from A to a to F to c' (pedals). Churches he provided instruments for include the following:

- St. Sebaldus Church, Nuremberg (small organ in 1471, restoration of the large organ originally by Heinrich Traxdorf in 1481)
- St. Martin, Amberg (1476)
- Moritzkirche, Coburg (1487)
- Strasbourg Cathedral, Strasbourg (small organ in 1478, large organ in 1491)
- St. George's Church, Haguenau (1493, completed by Krebs's nephew, Michael Dürr)

He died in Strasbourg, France.

== See also ==
- List of pipe organ builders
