= Bossi (organ builders) =

Family of Italian organ builders

The Bossi were a renowned firm of Italian organ builders originally from Mendrisio (Canton Ticino).

== Bossi family tree ==
Antonio; 16th century
Gabriele; 17th century
Giuseppe Antonio; 1680 - 1748
Angelo I 1717 - 1748
Giuseppe; 1738 - 1803 | Francesco; 1742 - 1816
Carlo; 1765 - 1836 | Giovanni; 1779 - 1821 | Angelo II; 1793 - 1861
Felice; 1795 - 1873 | Ottavia; 1798 - ? | d. Giuseppe; 1800 - 1862 | Pellegrino; 1802 - ? | Girolamo; 1804 - 1877 | Adeodato; 1805 - 1891 | Aurelio; 1812 - 1847 | Francesco II; 1818 - 1861 | Giovanni II; 1821 - dopo 1863
Luigi Balicco; 1833 - 1911 | Gabriele; 1839 - dopo 1872
Giacomo Vegezzi; 1825 - 1883 | Annetta Vittino; 1816 - 1886
Carlo I 1858 - 1927 | Francesco I 1870 - 1943
Alessandra; 1880 - 1956 | Celestino Balbiani; 1880 - 1956 | Carlo II; 1900 - 1977
Natale II; 1920 | Cesare; 1922 | Alessandro; 1926 | Francesco II; 1937 - 1984
Enrico; 1964
