= Reuter Organ Company =

Pipe organ company

Reuter Organ Company is a pipe organ builder located in Lawrence, Kansas.

== History ==
=== Establishment ===
The Reuter Organ Company was founded in 1917 by A.C. Reuter, Earl Schwarz and Henry Jost as the Reuter-Schwarz Organ Company in Trenton, Illinois.

A.C. Reuter held positions at Wicks, Pilcher and Casavant Frères from about 1904. Reuter's nephew, A.G. Sabol, left Casavant to work for his uncle's firm shortly after the company's founding. The company had four other employees at the time of its founding besides Reuter and Sabol, they were Jake Schaeffer, a voicer from Casavant, E.J. "Pat" Netzer, wood worker, William Zweifel, pipe maker, and Frank Jost, console builder.

The first Reuter was completed in 1917, and was the firm's only organ built that year; the instrument consisted of eight stops over two manuals and pedals, and was sold to Trinity Episcopal Church in Mattoon, Illinois. While the organ sat in the erecting room a tornado struck Trenton, and blew out one of the factory walls. The assembled organ suffered severe damage. The company carried insurance, and neither the church, nor Reuter incurred any financial loss. A new instrument, opus 2, was built and set up in Trinity Episcopal.

=== Move to Kansas ===
In March 1919, Carl Preyer, head of the piano department of the University of Kansas, was in St. Louis to perform with the Saint Louis Symphony Orchestra. Following his concert, Preyer traveled to Trenton, Illinois to visit the Reuter factory at the invitation of Sam Bihr, the Reuter representative for Kansas. While in Trenton, Preyer learned that Reuter was contemplating a move. Lawrence, Kansas was one of three sites being considered for a future location. During the installation at the Masonic Temple in April 1919, Preyer convinced the company officials to select Lawrence as its new home. The Wilder Brothers shirt factory, vacant at the time, was purchased as the new Reuter headquarters.

While the factory in Lawrence was being prepared, the employees in Trenton started the arduous task of dismantling, crating and loading all of the equipment and furnishings. Eventually it took eight railway boxcars to move the production operation from Trenton to Lawrence.

On September 5, 1919, the company was incorporated in the State of Kansas. The board of directors was listed as E.G Schwarz, A.C. Reuter, H.T. Jost, G.O. Foster, and W.B Downing. Foster and Downing were both with the University of Kansas. The Lawrence Chamber of Commerce had pledged funds to help defray the cost of moving. On January 1, 1920, the new office was open for business, and on March 1 the remodeled factory opened for production. The city of Lawrence could now boast that it was one of the few communities in the nation with a pipe organ factory.

The first instrument built in the Lawrence plant was opus 27, a 23-rank organ for the Central Congregational Church in Topeka, Kansas. On July 3, 1920, the Lawrence community was invited to a public recital on the completed instrument in the assembly room. The performers were Professor C. S. Skilton, Professor C. Preyer, and Mrs. Sylvia Osborn at the console; Professor W.B. Downing and Miss Helmick sang solos; and Mr. W.B. Dalton played the cello.

Shortly after the move to Kansas, Earl Schwarz left the company, and Schwarz's name was dropped, and the company became The Reuter Organ Company.

During the era of silent films, the company built a few dozen theatre organs.

During the 1940s-1960s, architectural engineer Albert George Sabol II (A. G. Sabol's son) worked at the plant and eventually supervised as company president. Additionally, A. G. Sabol II became the controlling shareholding with a 51% ownership of the company.

=== New factory ===
On June 4, 2001, Chairman of the Board Albert Neutel officially opened Reuter's new $4 million headquarters on the northwest edge of town; a building with double the space of the old Wilder Bros. shirt factory. The company has organs in the United States, Canada, Taiwan, and Korea.

=== Factory sold ===
In November 2022, Reuter announced the sale of their 78,000 square-foot facility to Harvesters, a regional Feeding America food bank. Albert Neutel, Jr., is continuing the Reuter business on a limited scope.

== See also ==
- Carnival of Souls – 1962 movie filmed at the factory
