= St Albans Cathedral (Pretoria) =

Anglican church in South Africa

St Albans Cathedral is an Anglican church on Schoeman Street in downtown Pretoria, South Africa. The current cathedral is an extension of an Anglican church built on the property in 1879, which was converted into a cathedral in 1909. The church is named after Saint Alban, the first Christian martyr of Britain.

The cathedral features a metal cross in honor of Prince Christian Victor of Schleswig-Holstein, who died of enteric fever during the Second Boer War. The organ is a notable instrument built by the South African Organ Builders in 1958.
