= Cedric Arnold, Williamson & Hyatt =

Organ builder in Essex

Cedric Arnold Williamson & Hyatt Ltd
- Formerly: Cedric Arnold, Williamson & Hyatt
- Founded: 1961
- Founder: Cedric Arnold, Martin Williamson, CJC Hyatt
- Defunct: 1973
- Fate: Acquired by Hill, Norman & Beard
- Headquarters: Thaxted, Essex, England
- Area served: International
- Key people: Cedric Arnold, Martin Williamson, CJC Hyatt
- Products: Pipe organ builders

Cedric Arnold, Williamson & Hyatt (sometimes referred to as Arnold, Williamson & Hyatt) was an English pipe organ maker and refurbisher in Thaxted, Essex formed in 1961 by the merger of the organ building and restoring practices of Cedric Arnold and the firm of Williamson & Hyatt. It was acquired by Hill, Norman & Beard in 1973.

== Origins ==
=== Williamson & Hyatt ===
The firm of Williamson & Hyatt of Trunch, Norfolk, was established in 1950 by Martin Williamson and CJC Hyatt.

==== Martin Williamson ====
Martin Williamson (22 December 1925 – 27 July 2010) was born in Norwich, the son of the classicist G.A. Williamson MC and his wife Annie (née Griffths). The painter Harold Sandys Williamson was an uncle. Williamson died in 2010.

Williamson was educated at Norwich School (where his father was classics master) and then the Birmingham School of Art where he studied cabinet making and allied crafts. After training with Stanley Lambert of Nicholson & Co Ltd and J. W. Walker & Sons Ltd, in around 1947 he started organ-building himself in Birmingham. During that time he built a small one-manual organ for St Anne's Church, Earlham (for which he then built a replacement in 1952), although the National Pipe Organ Register makes no reference to either instrument.

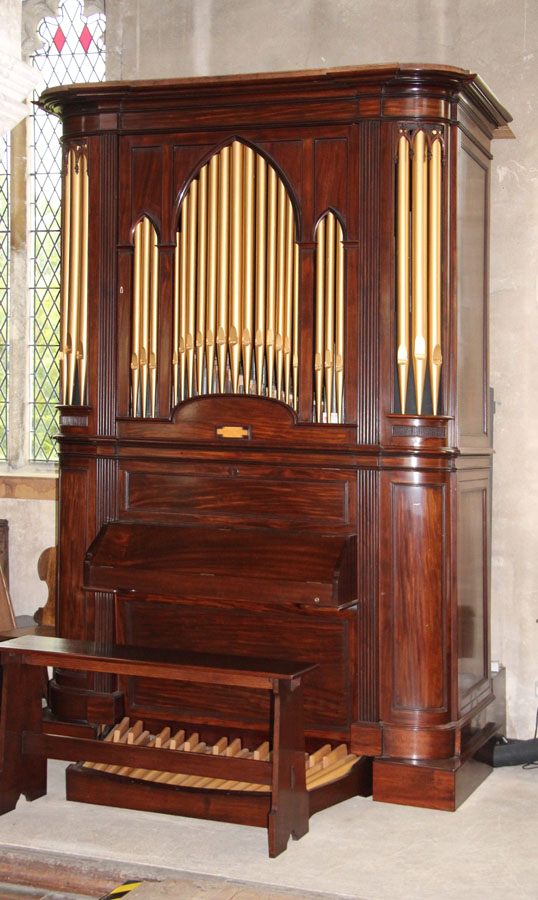
The 1808 William Gray organ in St Botolph's, Trunch, rebuilt by Williamson & Hyatt

Williamson then established his organ-building practice in an old flint barn in the village of Trunch in 1950, which had previously been occupied by a rural craftsman, Hector Benson. His earliest works were renovations of the instruments in St Peter & St Paul, Knapton, St Michael, Sidestrand and St James, Southrepps churches (the last of which dating from 1949). Another early instrument was enlarging and installing an 1808 William Gray organ from St Leonard's, Marston Green into Trunch Church.

==== CJC Hyatt ====
Clifford James Cecil Hyatt (1928 – 17 November 2020) was born in Edmonton, Middlesex, in 1928, to Cecil Hyatt and Doris Hyatt (née Rowe). He was a renowned voicer as well as an organ-builder, and trained under Henry Willis III at Henry Willis & Sons. Hyatt died in 2020, in Norwich.

==== Some notable organs ====
- St Mary's RC Church, Ipswich: an undated organ.
- Paston College: a 1959 rebuilding of the 1938 Hill, Norman & Beard organ. That 1938 organ, in turn, had originally been built by the Oxford organ-builders Martin & Coate in 1930 for St John's College Chapel.

=== Cedric Arnold ===
Ernest Charles Arnold (always known as Cedric Arnold) (26 October 1907 – 10 October 1980) was a pipe organ maker and refurbisher in Thaxted, Essex, who established his practice in 1927, initially in Chelmsford, and subsequently in Thaxted from 1932. In 1961 he merged his practice with the firm of Williamson & Hyatt. Most Cedric Arnold organs are located in East Anglia.

Arnold was born in Chelmsford in 1907, the son of Ernest Arnold (1874-1970), a bookseller, and Ada Julia (née Arter) (1868-1946). He was educated at Bishop's Stortford College. In the 1950s he restored the 1923-25 Rest Cartwright organ in the Memorial Hall at the College; Arnold had been apprenticed to Rest Cartwright from 1923 to 1927.

Arnold was the Chief Fire Officer in Thaxted during WWII. He died in 1980, aged 72.

==== Organ building practice ====
Arnold's early work was mostly to update and rebuild existing organs: in 1927 (when he was described as being of Chelmsford), he overhauled the undated A. Hunter & Son instrument at St Andrew's, Belchamp St Paul. Probably in the same year, Arnold restored the Theodore Charles Bates instrument at St Thomas, Bradwell-on-Sea, although there is some uncertainty about the exact date. In 1928 he restored and moved the Bishop & Son 1890 organ in St Peter & St Paul's, Carbrooke in Norfolk, at the start of the incumbency of the socialist cleric, George B. Chambers. In 1929 he built an organ, making use of parts from an older instrument, for Our Lady of Mount Carmel RC Church in Harwich (now located in Our Lady Queen of Heaven RC Church, Dovercourt).

He moved his organ building practice to Thaxted in 1932 and is recorded as a church organ builder in Thaxted in the 1933 Kelly's Directory. He was building his own organs by 1934, as in that year the Essex Newsman recorded the dedication of a new organ at Little Waltham Congregational Church built by Arnold. Arnold built this organ with a case of Japanese oak. Another early instrument was his 1935 organ at Severalls Hospital in Colchester, now demolished and the organ removed to St Clement's Anglican Church in La Richardais in Brittany in 2016.

Notable organs include Arnold's 1952 Conrad Noel Memorial Organ in the tower arch of St John the Baptist, Our Lady & St Laurence, Thaxted, being an installation of a GP England 1795 instrument from an unknown earlier location, and the rebuilt 1905 Norman and Beard instrument in the Butterfield church of St Mary's Ardleigh.

The last organs that Arnold worked on alone were the Gildersleeve & Co instrument at St Edmund’s RC Church, Bury St Edmunds in 1960 and the 1919 ER Tyrell instrument at St Mary's, Comberton, Cambridgeshire in 1963 (with an organ plate presumably prepared prior to the merger with Williamson & Hyatt).

== Organ building by the merged firm ==
The most notable instrument is that in St Mary's, Little Walsingham, built in 1964 after the devastating fire of 1961 (destroying the church's early Casson organ). Two years later, they built an organ for the Shrine at Walsingham, incorporating elements from the J G Trustam organ from St Andrew, Ampthill, Bedfordshire. In 1996, that organ was removed and replaced by an electronic instrument, and was installed in St Martin, Welton le Marsh, Lincolnshire by Holmes & Swift.

== Some notable organs ==
- St Botolph's, Colchester: 1960 alterations by Cedric Arnold to a 1890 J. W. Walker & Sons Ltd, then rebuilt in 1966 by Cedric Arnold, Williamson & Hyatt.
- St Edmund's Church, Southwold: a 1966 rebuild of an 1887 J. W. Walker organ, with a new detached stop-tab console and a new choir division within the existing Victorian chancel case.
- Great St Mary’s Church, Sawbridgeworth: a 1967 rebuild of an 1886 Forster & Andrews organ, housed within a striking new case at the west end of the church above the tower arch, to a design by the renowned church architect Gerard Goalen.
- Alderman Peel High School, Wells-next-the-Sea: a 1967 installation of a 1820 J.C. Bishop organ.
- St Mary the Virgin Church, Kelvedon: a 1968 rebuild of a 1880 Alfred Monk organ.
- St James Church, Gerrards Cross: a 1970 rebuild of a 1861 Henry Jones organ.
- Christ Church, Billericay: a 1970 installation of a 1895 Bevington organ from St John, Mountnessing, an iron church.

== Legacy ==
Cedric Arnold, Williamson & Hyatt was acquired by Hill, Norman & Beard in 1973. The company itself was not dissolved until 1999.

Hyatt continued to build and restore organs, working with Paul Skellern in 1982 on the instrument in St Martin's, Fenny Stratford, Bletchley. (Skellern had worked with Williamson & Hyatt from the earliest days of their practice.)
