= Koenig (organ builder) =

French organ building company

Kœnig facteurs d'orgues
- Industry: manufacture of musical instruments
- Founded: 1945
- Headquarters: Sarre-Union, Grand Est, France
- Key people: Yves Kœnig (President) Huguette Kœnig (General Manager)
- Products: pipe organs
- Services: building, restoring and maintenance
- Website: www.orgues-koenig.com

Kœnig pipe organ builders, known as manufacture d'orgues Kœnig, is a French firm that designs, builds and restores pipe organs. This organ building, family-owned manufacture is based in Sarre-Union, Alsace, and founded in 1945.

== Achievements ==
Kœnig is specifically renowned for being the first contemporary organ builder to have performed in 1967 the recreation of a pipe organ, complying with the precepts found in the 1778 book L'Art du facteur d'orgues by Dom Bédos. This masterpiece can be seen in Saint-Georges' Church of Bouquenom in Sarre-Union.

The workshop regularly contributes to the restoration of historical listed organs.

== History ==
Jean-Georges Koenig, born on May 16, 1920, in Strasbourg and died on November 26, 1992, purchased the business from the widow of organ builder Henry Vondrasek in order to resurrect the factory that had been established in 1930.

Yves Kœnig, born on May 16, 1950, began working with his father in the 1970s, fully taking over the business in 1982.

He is assisted since 2008 by Julien Marchal, born on Octobre 29, 1990, whom he gradually prepared for his succession.
