= Lorenzo Musante =

Italian organ builder (c.1730–1780)

Lorenzo Musante (c. 1730−17 April 1780) was an Italian pipe organ builder.
