= Lefebvre family =

Family of French organ builders

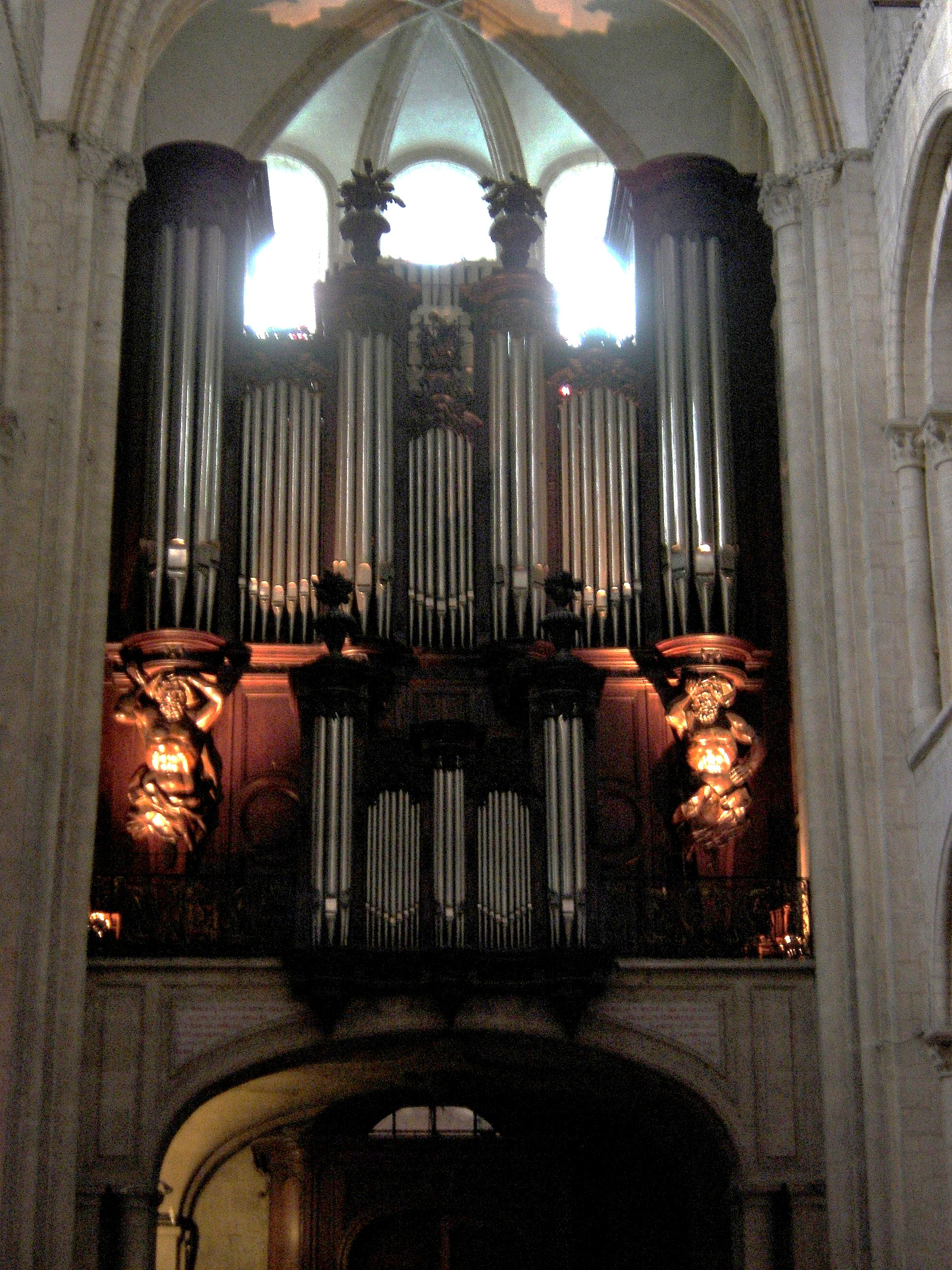
Saint-Étienne de Caen

The Lefebvre family was a family of famous organ builders in 17th and 18th century Normandy, France. The last name has occasionally been written as Lefèvre.

== Organ builders and their work ==
=== Clément Lefebvre (1630-1709) ===
Clément was father of Charles Lefebvre and a well-known organist in Rouen.

- 1670: Work on organ at Le Havre Cathedral (French article)
- 1685: Clement Lefebvre and his son, Germain, from Rouen, worked on the organ for the Saint-Michel Church
- 1724-1735 Jean-Baptiste (another one of Clement's sons) maintained the Saint-Michel Church organ.

=== Charles Lefebvre (1670-1737) ===
- 1724: worked on the organ at Saint-Ouen Abbey Church
- 1731-1733: restored the 1661 organ at Saint-Éloi Church (33 stops, 3 keyboards, 1 pedalboard) along with Jean-Baptiste Nicolas Lefebvre
- 1732: built the organ at the Chapel of Charles-Nicolle Hospital in Rouen (22 stops, three manual keyboards and a pedalboard).
- 1732: Rebuilt the Antoine Jousseline (or Josseline) organ of the Church of Saint-Maclou.
- 1732 & 1746: Repairs to organ at Saint-Gervais-Saint-Protais Collegiate Church of Gisors

=== Jean-Baptiste Nicolas Lefebvre (1705-1784) ===
JBNL was son of Charles Lefebvre, was one of the most famous European organ makers of the 18th century, building giant organs with five keyboards.

- 1731-1733: restored the 1661 organ at Saint-Éloi Church (33 stops, 3 keyboards, 1 pedalboard) along with Charles Lefebvre
- 1737-1747: Brothers Jean-Baptiste Nicolas Lefebvre and Louis Lefebvre along with their cousin Clement Lefebvre are commissioned to build a new organ at Abbey of Saint-Étienne, Caen (60 stops, 5 keyboards, 1 pedalboards)
- 1739-1740: An important restoration to the gothic Antoine Josseline and Gilbert Cocquerel organ of Église Notre-Dame Caudebec-en-Caux (Seine-Maritime) by brothers Jean-Baptiste and Louis Lefebvre (4 keyboards, 1 pedalboard).
- 1740: worked on Saint-Éloi Church
- 1741: the Saint-Ouen Abbey Church organ was dismantled "in order to obviate damage and considerable loss that could be incurred to their organ by the presence of wheat and other grains in their church..." The date of reassembly is unknown.
- 1741: Restoration of tribune organ at Montivilliers Abbey
- 1746: Construction of a new 30-stop organ in the sepulcher of Montivilliers Abbey by brothers Jean-Baptiste Nicolas Lefebvre and Louis Lefebvre.
- 1751-1752: Restoration to organ at Saint-Gervais-Saint-Protais Collegiate Church of Gisors
- 1760: worked on the Saint-Michel Church organ and restored the wind system in 1771
- 1761: Saint-Martin de Tours (67 stop, 5 keyboards)
- 1763-1772: Notre-Dame de Rouen cathedral
- 1769-1774: More restoration work on organ at Saint-Gervais-Saint-Protais Collegiate Church of Gisors
- 1774: worked on Saint-Éloi Church
- 1779: Complete restoration of organ at Le Havre Cathedral (French article)
- 1780-1784: Restoration work by JBNL (until his death in 1784) on tribune organ at Montivilliers Abbey

=== Louis Lefebvre (1708-1754) ===
Louis-Charles Lefebvre was son of Charles Lefebvre.

- 1737-1747: Brothers Jean-Baptiste Nicolas Lefebvre and Louis Lefebvre along with their cousin Clement Lefebvre are commissioned to build a new organ at Abbey of Saint-Étienne, Caen (60 stops, 5 keyboards, 1 pedalboards)
- 1739-1740: An important restoration to the gothic Antoine Josseline and Gilbert Cocquerel organ of Église Notre-Dame Caudebec-en-Caux (Seine-Maritime) by brothers Jean-Baptiste and Louis Lefebvre (4 keyboards, 1 pedalboard).
- 1746: Construction of a new 30-stop organ in the sepulcher of Montivilliers Abbey by brothers Jean-Baptiste Nicolas Lefebvre and Louis Lefebvre.

== Genealogy of the family ==
The following is the known genealogy of the family.

Hector Lefebvre
x Jacqueline Rabette
│
└──> Nicolas Lefebvre
     x (1629) Ysabeau Morin
     │
     └──> Madeleine
     │
     └──>  Clément I (c. 1630 - 29 September 1709)
           x (10 August 1653) Anne Leloup 
           │
           └──> Nicolas (6 June 1654 - ?)
           └──> Germain (6 October 1656 - 1694)
           │
           └──> Clément II (21 August 1658 - 23 January 1697}
           │    x (4 July 1694) Philippe Arnout 
           │    │
           │    └──> Clément III (31 December 1696 - ?)
           │
           └──> Anne-Françoise (21 August 1659 - ?)
           │    x (30 January 1684) Jacques Aubert, tailor
           │
           └──> Claude (|29 December 1667-?)
           │
           └──> Charles (22 May 1670 - 8 September 1737)
           │    x 1st (21 January 1699) Marie-Anne Sourdière (? - 9 May 1713)
           │      │
           │      └──> Marie (28 December 1700 - ?)
           │      └──> Charles-François (27 April 1703 - ?)
           │      └──> Pierre (1 Juillet 1704 - 2 September 1705)
           │      └──> Nicolas Jean-Baptiste (6 February 1705 - 26 March 1784), bachelor
           │      └──> Louis-Charles (23 May 1708 - 23 December 1754)
           │      │    x (1752) Marie-Anne Tricotté (? - Year XIII)
           │      │    │
           │      │    └──> Louis Jean-Baptiste Salomon « Lefebvre de Flamanville » (30 August 1753 - ?)
           │      │    └──> Alexandrine Françoise (24 September 1754 - ?)
           │      │
           │      └──> Jean-Baptiste (8 August 1710 - ?)
           │      │
           │      └──> Marie-Anne (9| January 1711 - ?)
           │    
           │     x 2nd (16 June 1716) Anne Collet
           │      │
           │      └──> Pierre(14 September 1717-?), priest of Bois-Robert
           │      └──> Jean-Charles (11 February 1721 - ?)
           │      └──> Anne-Marguerite (28 August 1722 - ?)
           │      └──> Charles-Pierre (21 June 1726 - ?)
           │
           └──> Jean-Baptiste (26 July 1677 - 11 June 1734)
                x (26 August 1708) Marie-Anne Heudeline
                │
                └──> Jean-Baptiste Martin (1710 - 1750)
                └──> Marie-Élisabeth (1711 - ?)
                └──> Marianne (1712 - ?)

== See also ==
- Organ building
