= Friedrich Haas (organ builder) =

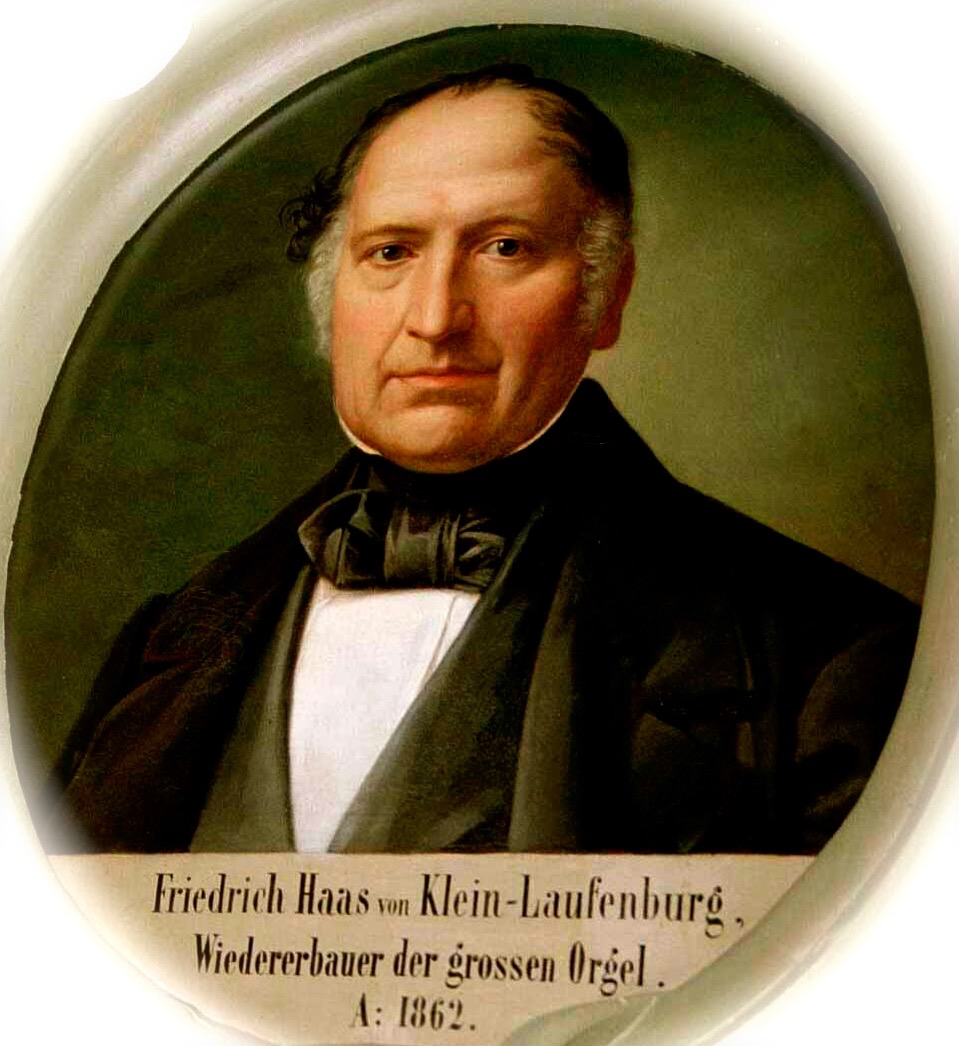
Friedrich Haas

Friedrich Haas (10 February 1811, Laufenburg, Germany – 18 July 1886, Lucerne) was a German-born Swiss organ builder. The New Grove Dictionary of Music and Musicians described him as Switzerland's "most important organ builder of the middle of the 19th century".
