= Levsen Organ Company =

Levsen Organ Company is a manufacturer of pipe organs based in Buffalo, Iowa, which is near the Quad Cities.

Rodney E. Levsen established a business to tune and repair electric pianos and organs in 1954. In 1965, Levsen began an association with the Wicks Organ Company, becoming a sales representative and installer.

In 1980 his firm began building organs under the Levsen name in Buffalo, Iowa. As of 2023, the company has built 122 organs. In addition, the firm tunes and maintain over 150 existing instruments, mainly in the upper Midwest. Levsen has also developed tools and computer software provided to other organ builders.
