= Hosler =

Hosler is a surname which is popular in America, Western Europe, and some parts of Italy. Notable people with the surname include:

- Jay Hosler, American writer
- Mark Hosler (born 1962), American musician

== See also ==
- Hößler
- Hosmer (surname)
