= James Chapman Bishop =

British organ builder (1783–1854)

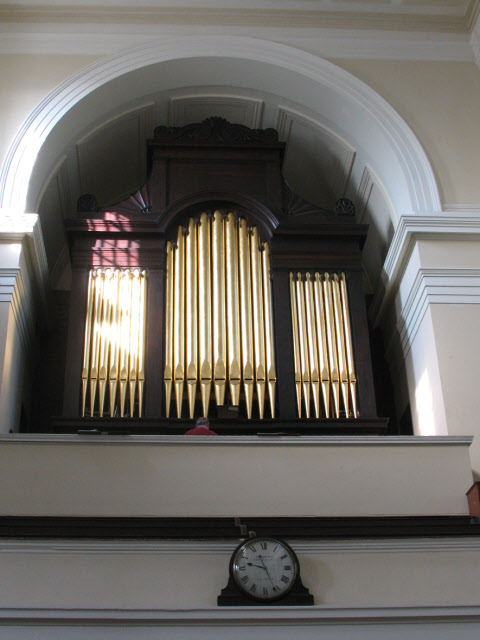
The organ of 1829 in St James's Church, Bermondsey

James Chapman Bishop (1783 – 2 December 1854) was a British organ manufacturer of the 19th century.

== History ==
He was apprenticed to Benjamin Flight and then set up his own business in London in 1807 initially at York buildings in Marylebone and later at 250 Marylebone Road.

On his death in 1854, the business was run by his son, Charles Augustus Bishop (born 1821), John Starr and William Ebenezer Richardson, and was known as Bishop, Starr and Richardson from 1854 to 1857, and then Bishop and Starr from 1857 onwards. From 1873 it became Bishop and Son.

== Works ==
- All Saints' Church, Northallerton 1818
- St Peter's Church, Dorchester 1823
- St Mary Abchurch 1823
- St John's Church, Waterloo 1824
- St Mary Aldermanbury 1824
- All Souls Church, Langham Place 1825
- St Mark's Church, North Audley Street 1825
- St Paul's Cathedral 1826
- Holy Trinity Church, Marylebone 1828
- The Revd Dr Philip Wynter, President, St John's College, Oxford 1828
- St James's Church, Bermondsey 1829
- St Bartholomew's Church, Wednesbury 1830
- St James' Church, Clapham 1832
- St Edmund, King and Martyr 1833
- Norwich Cathedral 1834
- St Michael's Church, Coventry 1836
- St Peter's Church, Eaton Square 1837
- St Giles Church, Willenhall 1837
- Port Antonio Church, Jamaica 1838
- Shrewsbury Music Hall 1839
- St James' Church, Devizes 1841
- Catholic Chapel, Dalton Square, Lancaster 1841
- Gravesend Literary Institution 1842
- Church of St Barnabas, Queen Camel 1842
- Roman Catholic Chapel, Stockton-on-Tees 1842
- Savoy Chapel 1843
- St Giles' Church, Camberwell 1844
- St Martin's Church, Liskeard 1844
- St Kentigern's Church, Crossthwaite, Cumbria 1844-45
- Holy Trinity Church, Clapham 1845
- St John's, Notting Hill 1846
- Holy Trinity Church, Paddington 1846
- St Martin's Church, Bowness-on-Windermere 1846
- Brighton Town Hall 1847
- Jesus College, Cambridge 1847
- Catholic Chapel, Lowther Street, Carlisle 1848
- Hereford Cathedral 1849
- St Mark's Church, Pensnett 1849
- St James's Church, Piccadilly 1852
- St George's, Bloomsbury 1853
