= Georges Danion =

French organ builder (1922–2005)

Georges Paul Aimé Danion (28 January 1922 – 24 December 2005) was a French organ builder.

== Biography ==
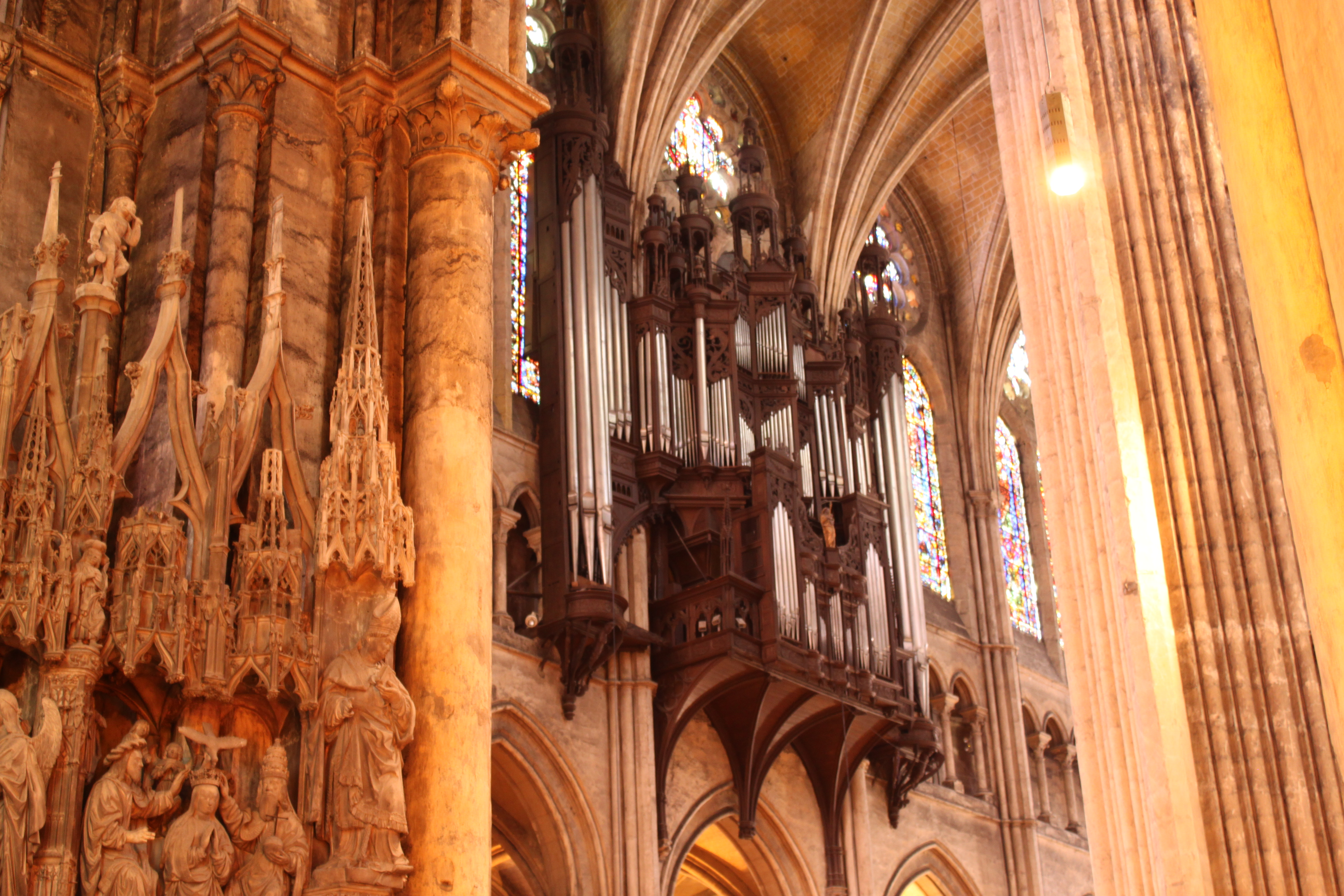
The Chartres Cathédral great organ

Danion was born in Luçon and moved to Paris in 1924. After studying the violin, he played in a Paris orchestra.

In 1945, he married Anik Gonzalez, daughter of Fernand Gonzalez and granddaughter of Victor Gonzalez, both renowned organ builders.

In 1947, Victor Gonzalez invited Danion to work with him and replace his son Fernand who had died during the war in 1940. Having a passion for technical harmonization, he learned fast with the master.

After the death of Victor Gonzalez in 1956, he became head of the Gonzalez company, henceforth commonly referred to as Danion-Gonzalez. Danion continued the neoclassical ideal of his master. The concept of neo-classical organ is a synthesis of the previous aesthetics, many quarrels and polemics within the world of organ making arose on the part of those who refused any developments in the organ-making tradition, including neo-baroque musicians. In 1962, he bought the Jacquot-Lavergne-Rambervillers company in the Vosges, then the oldest manufacturer of organs in the world still in operation since 1750.

In 1963, he moved the company to Rambervillers. The premises included a large assembly room, joinery workshops and casting of tin where the entire metal pipe for the new organs could be manufactured. Today the company is led by Bernard Dargassies under the name of "Manufacture Vosgienne de Grandes Orgues".

In January 1980, he founded with his wife, the "Manufacture Languedocienne de Grandes Orgues", in Lodève, Hérault.

In 1988, the Gonzalez-Danion sold their Rambervillers company and settled in Lodève where they worked on the construction or reconstruction of the organs of St. Esteve in Andorra-la-Vielle, St. Vincent of Carcassonne, St. Paul of Clermont-L'Hérault, the restoration of instruments in the cathedrals of Béziers and Carcassonne, Lodève, the churches Our Lady of La Ciotat, St Peter's Prades, Prats-de-Mollo-la-Preste, as well as the reconstruction of the organ in the Church of St. Sauveur Aix-en-Provence (39 stops) and restored those of St. Peter's in Ceret (36 stops) and Ste-Bernadette Montpellier (13 stops). Since Danion retirement in 1998, the company has been managed by organ builder and harmonist Charles Emmanuel Sarélot.

In February 1992, George Danion was invited by the university of Denton, Texas to give a conference on organ building at a gathering of some two hundred organists, with Marie-Claire Alain, Marie-Madeleine Duruflé, Marie-Louise Langlais, and Jacqueline Marchal.

He died on Christmas Eve of 2005 in Lodève.

In the preface to the inauguration program of the Meaux Cathedral organ rebuilt by Danion in 1980, Olivier Messiaen honored his art:

"The Meaux Cathedral, of which the great BOSSUET was the bishop, needed a large organ whose timbres were capable of expressing religious voices of past centuries and contemporary times. Conservators have understood. They have just completed a synthesis instrument on which it will be possible to play FRESCOBALDI and Nicolas de Grigny, as well as JS BACH, romantics and masters of the 20th century, like DUPRÉ. Let us rejoice on such a view, and wish this new instrument to resonate often with eclectic performers."

== Churches with Danion organs ==
=== In France ===
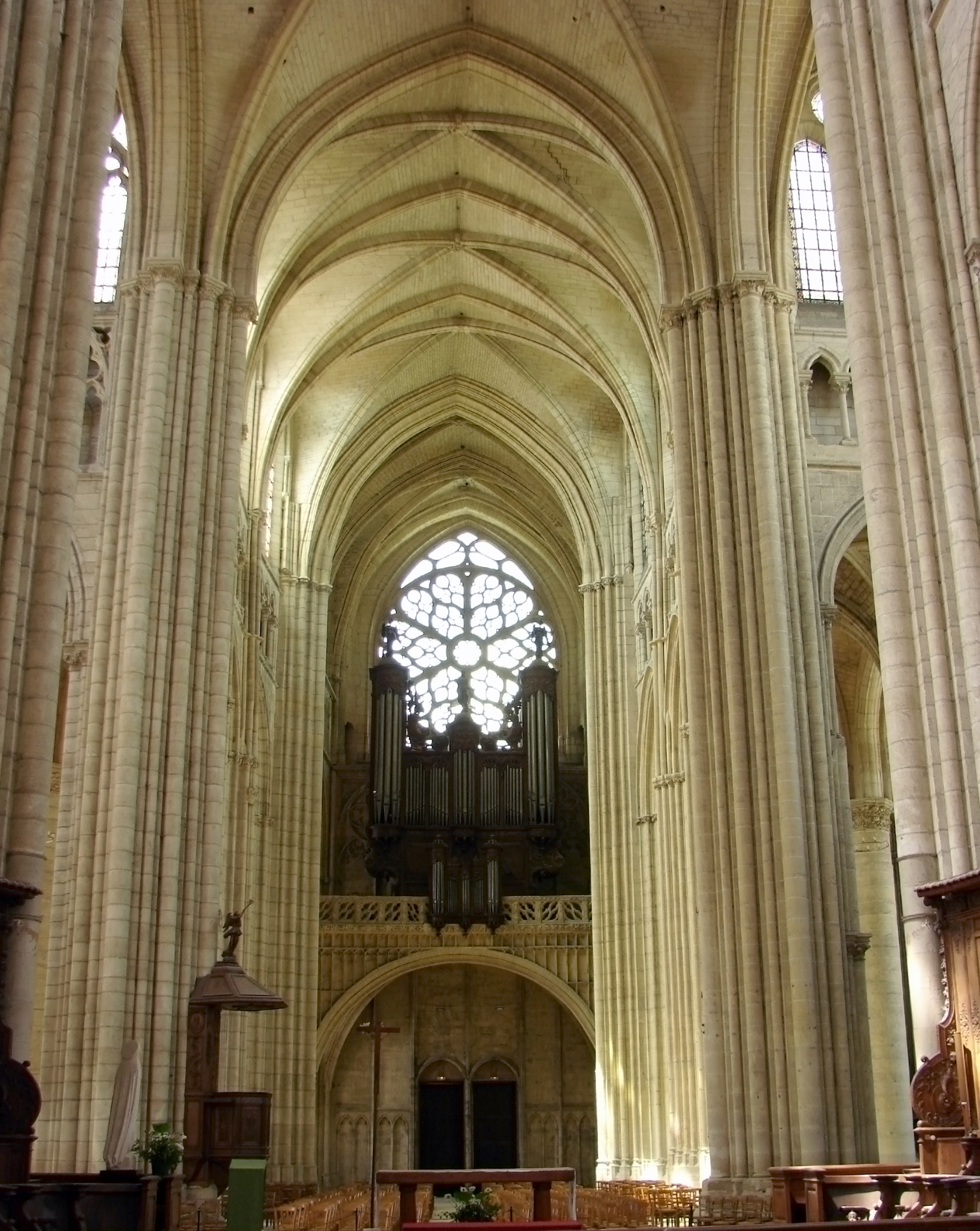
Meaux Cathedral organ

- Studio 104 de Radio France, built in 1957 and 1966 by Danion-Gonzalez transferred to cathédrale Notre-Dame-de-la-Treille (Lille), 2008.
- Saint-Jacques de Reims (1962), restored in 1977
- Limoges Cathedral (1963)
- Troyes Cathedral (1966)
- Church of Saint-Pierre, Caen (1968), replaced by a Jean-François Dupont in 1997
- Chartres Cathedral (1971)
- Basilique Saint-Denys d'Argenteuil, orgue Louis Suret (1867), reworked by Danion-Gonzalez in 1971–1973
- Le Mans Cathedral (1974)
- Nevers Cathedral (1978)
- Beauvais Cathedral (1979)
- Collégiale St-Martin de Montmorency (1979)
- Meaux Cathedral (1980)
- Bordeaux Cathedral (1982)
- Besançon Cathedral (1987)

=== In Paris ===
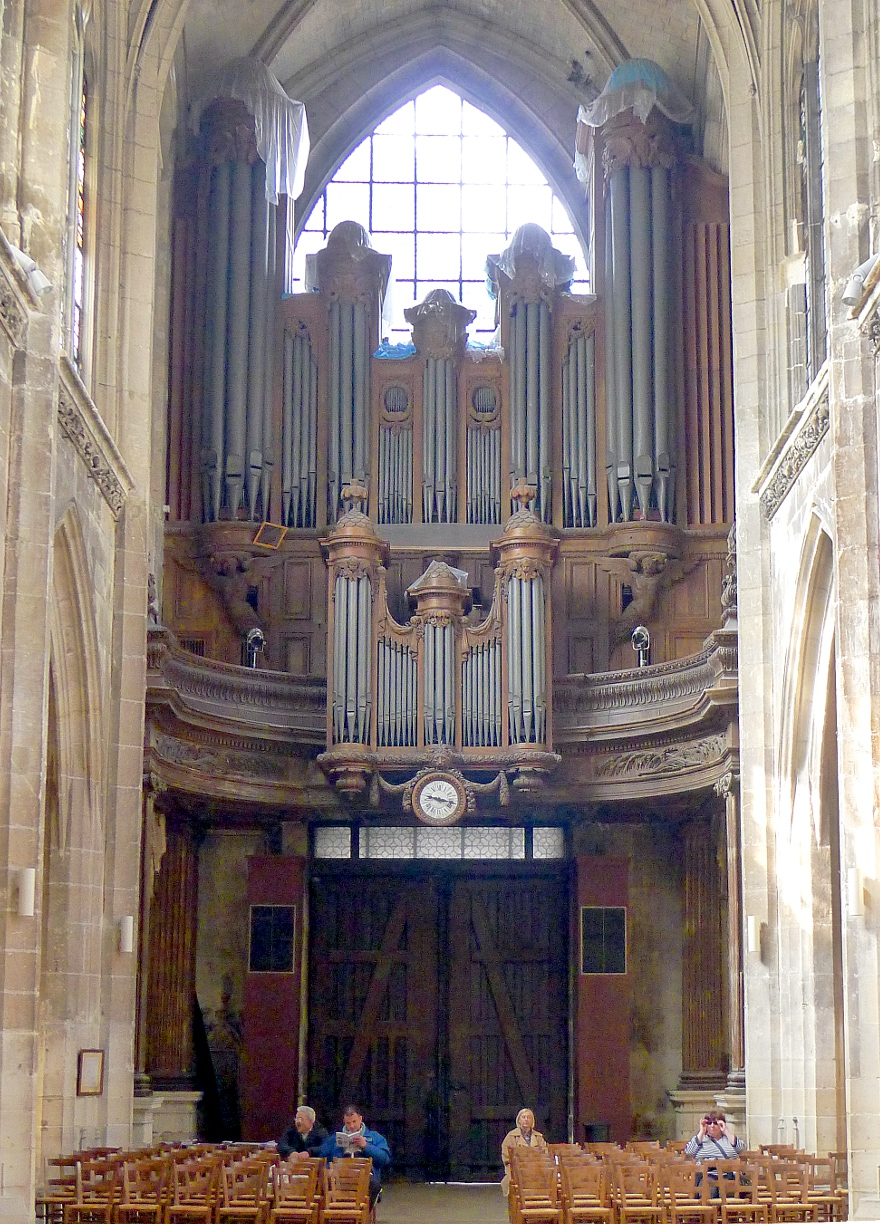
Eglise Saint-Merri, Paris

- L'Oratoire du Louvre (1961–1962),
- l'église Saint-Joseph-des-Nations (rue St-Maur) (1963),
- l'église évangélique Baptiste (1965),
- l'église Saint-Joseph-Artisan (Paris) (1966),
- Saint-Merri (orgue de chœur, 1968),
- l'église Notre-Dame-des-Champs (orgue de chœur Merklin, (restored in 1969),
- Saint-Vincent-de-Paul, Paris (1970),
- l'Église Notre-Dame-de-l'Assomption (Paris) (1970),
- la Cathédrale arménienne Saint-Jean-Baptiste de Paris (1970),
- Church of Notre-Dame de la Salette, Paris (1970),
- La Madeleine, Paris (grand orgue 1971, orgue de chœur 1976),
- Saint-Paul-Saint-Louis (1972),
- Saint-Augustin, Paris (orgue de chœur, 1973),
- l'église Saint-Louis-d'Antin (1973),
- St-Gervais-et-St-Protais (1974),
- Saint-Étienne-du-Mont (1975),
- l'église Saint-Pierre-du-Gros-Caillou (1978),
- l'église Saint-Jacques-Saint-Christophe de la Villette (1983),
- l'Église Saint-François-de-Sales (ancienne église, 1985).

== See also ==
- Organ building
