= Stephan Kaschendorf =

German organ builder (c.1425–1499)

Stephan Kaschendorf (Caschindorf, Castendorfer, Kastendörfer) (ca. 1425 – after 4 February 1499) was an early German organ builder. He was born in Wrocław (then Breslau) and at first was an apprentice to a carpenter. He only learnt organ building later and it is not known who his teachers were. He was one of the leading organ builders of the second half of the 15th century and a progressive one. His instruments all feature independent divisions and stops (Hauptwerk and Rückpositiv/Brustwerk), unlike the older Blockwerk gothic organs. Churches he built organs for include the following:

- St. Mary Magdalene's Church, Wrocław (1455)
- St. Egidien, Nuremberg (1460)
- St. Elisabeth, Wrocław (1460–64)
- Georgskirche, Nördlingen (1464–66)
- Frauenkirche, Nuremberg (1464–66)
- Mariendom Cathedral, Erfurt (1480–83)
- St. Sebaldus Church, Nuremberg (lead roofing maintenance only, 1483)
- St. Ulrich und Afra, Augsburg (chancel organ only, 1490)

Kaschendorf's sons Caspar, Melchior, and Michael were also organ builders and assisted their father in Erfurt. He owned houses in Schweidnitz (where he also built an organ) and Dresden, but apparently died in poverty.

== See also ==
- List of organ builders
