= Andries van Bolder =

Dutch cabinetmaker and chest maker

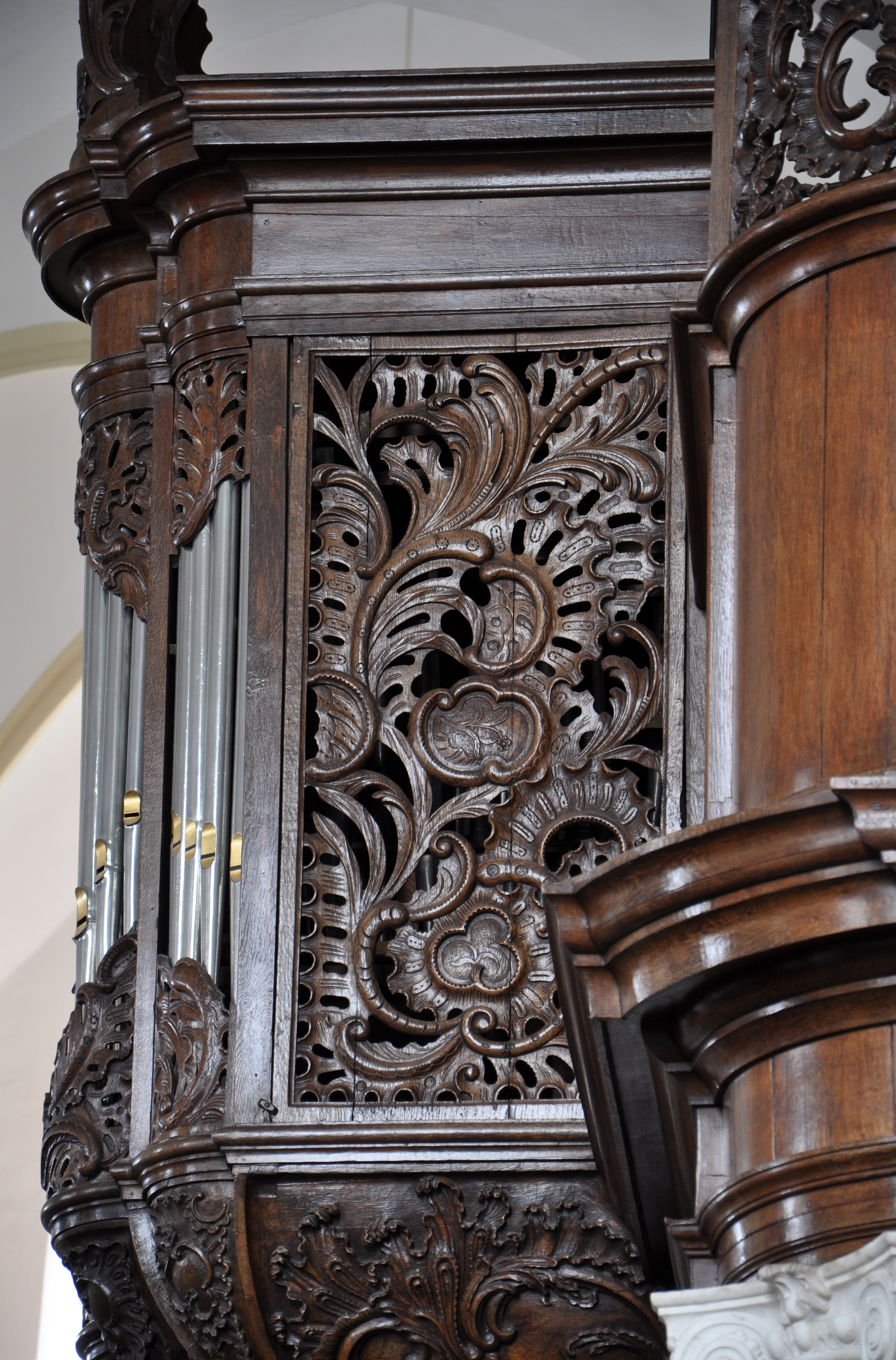
- Woodcarving by Andries van Bolder on the organ of the Grote Kerk in Nijkerk
- Born: early 18th-century Arnhem, Dutch Republic
- Died: 1 July 1763
- Occupations: Cabinetmaker, organ builder
- Known for: Woodcarving of 18th-century Dutch church organs

Andries van Bolder (1st-half of the 18th-century - 1 July 1763) was a Dutch cabinetmaker and chest maker from Arnhem. He is most notable for making organs and carving organ cases in the Dutch Republic that are still in use.

On 25 September 1741, he was admitted to the Arnhem guild of chest makers. In 1753-1754, Van Bolder made the organ for the Reformed Church in Oldebroek that was later moved to the Oude Kerk in Heemstede. The organ has been restored several times and is still in use. On 18 February 1755 he signed the contract for this commission to craft the woodcarvings on the organ case of the Van Deventer organ in the Grote Kerk in Nijkerk. He finished this work in 1756.

Bolder was married twice. In 1749, he lost his first wife, Wilhelmina Arisse. On 1 June 1754, he married his second wife, Johanna Meuwze. Van Bolder died on 1 July 1763 and was buried on 2 July 1763.
