= Giovanni Pradella =

Italian organ builder (born 1971)

Giovanni Pradella (born 1971) founded the Pradella Organ Workshop, located in the Valtellina province of Sondrio since 1993. Specialized in building new organs and restoring old ones. The Pradella Workshop has recaptured the technique used by the renaissance master. Giovanni Pradella is now internationally renowned, commissioned with prestigious restorations and new instruments. He has collaborated with other notable organ builders, among whom is the German, Gerald Wohel, on the restoration of an Italian style organ at the University of Rochester, in the United States.

== New instruments ==
- San Rocco Sondrio
- Mossini, Sondrio
- Viboldone (Milan)
- Somaggia (Sondrio)
- Valle di Colorina (Sondrio, tuned to A415)

== Restoration ==
- Peglio (Como, Costanzo Antegnati-Organ, (December 9, 1549 - November 14, 1624) was an organist, organ builder, and composer)
- Caspano (Prati 1683 - Colombo 1862)
- Colorina (Rejna 1696)
- Gerola (Serassi 1837)
- Cavernago (Serassi 1781)
- Madonna del Giglio in Bergamo (Annonymus 17. cent.)
- Vigorso di Budrio (Malamini 16. Jhdt. - Franchini 1861)
- Plzeň-Litice (Gebr. Müller 1833)

== Articles ==
- Technical aspects of Carlo Prati’s work to the Academy of Smarano in Trento
- Sessantini, Gilberto: Fughe al convento. Il nuovo organo Giovanni Pradella 2004 dell'Abbazia di Viboldone (Milano). in: Arte Organaria e Organistica 13, 2006, Nr. 61, Seite 22-27.
- Der Orgelbauer aus Sondrio in Alpen-Donau-Adria Magazin am 8.7.2007 Bayerischen Rundfunk
- undertook research for the Parish of Primolo, in Sondrio, into the celebrated Valtellina artist Pietro Ligari
