= A. L. White Manufacturing Company =

Retail company

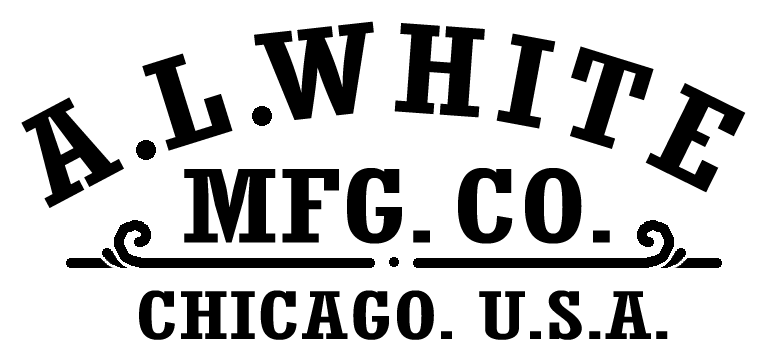
- Trade name: A. L. White Mfg, Co.
- Industry: Retail
- Founded: 1900; Chicago, Illinois, U.S.
- Founder: Albert Lorenzo White (President)
- Defunct: 1946
- Fate: Closed in 1946
- Headquarters: 1902 W. Grand Ave., Chicago, Illinois
- Products: Organ (music)
- Owner: Independent

The A. L. White Manufacturing Company was a retail and manufacturing company and one of the original pioneers of the folding portable organ. During World War I, they manufactured folding chaplain organs for the U.S. Army that could be used in the field.

== History ==
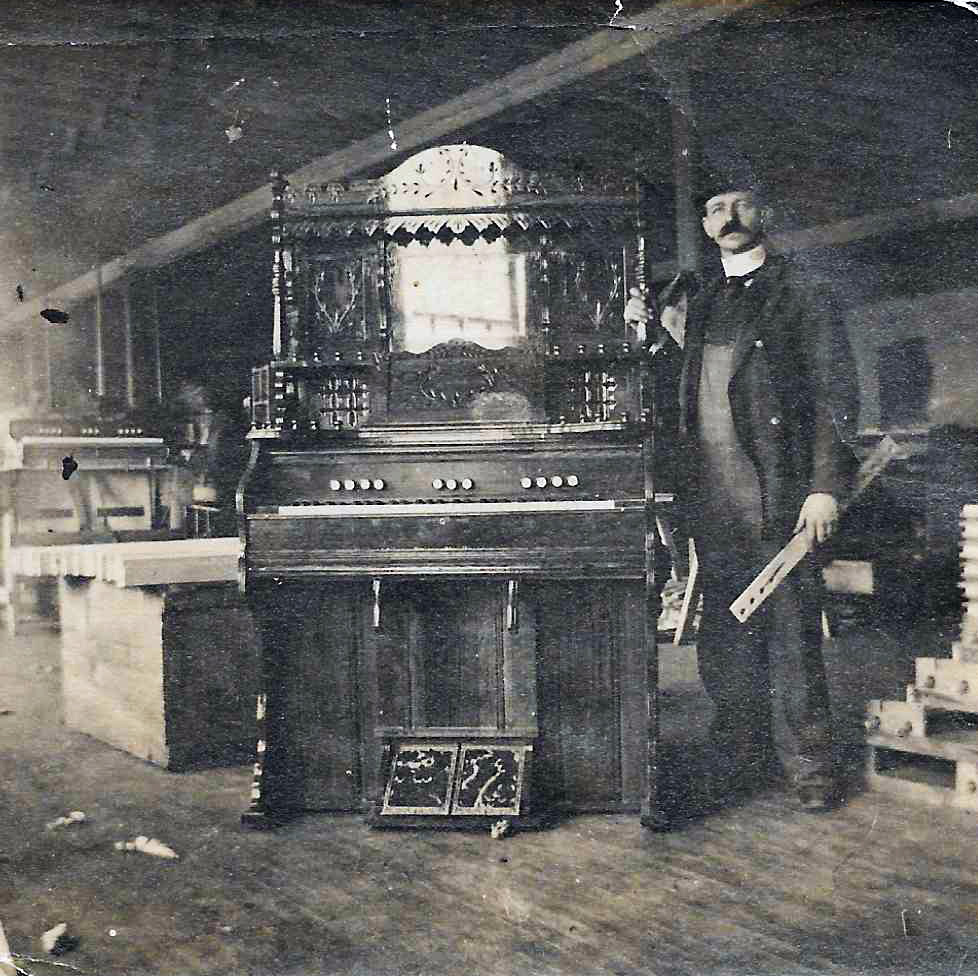
A. L. White and Organ

Albert Lorenzo White was born on June 8, 1866, and grew up learning the carpentry trade in Yalesville, Connecticut, before moving to Detroit in 1885. After a failed marriage, he moved to Chicago, where he founded the A.L. White Manufacturing Company in 1900 and started to produce folding, portable organs as well as conventional organs that were purchased by houses of worship.

== Pipe Tone Folding Organ ==
Albert White invented a pipe tone folding organ in 1904 (patent number 776,004). This organ, later marketed as the Liberty Pipetone Folding Organ, allowed for the bellows, pedals and levels to be compactly folded and enclosed in a case that could be carried efficiently. The patent was filed with the U. S. Patent Office February 24, 1903, and it was granted on November 29, 1904.

== World War I ==
During World War I, the Chaplin Corporation was founded. Clergy could not be drafted and the military relied on volunteers to fill the need for moral guidance and troop morale. By the end of the war, nearly 9,000 chaplains joined the war effort, with approximately 3,000 serving in Europe alone. Because they were non-combatants, they did not carry a firearm with them into battle. Often, they would carry a Bible, or other religious text instead. But their personal equipment included a portable altar with all of the materials needed to carry out an entire religious service. This equipment list, in many cases, included a compact field organ. A. L. White supplied many of these organs.

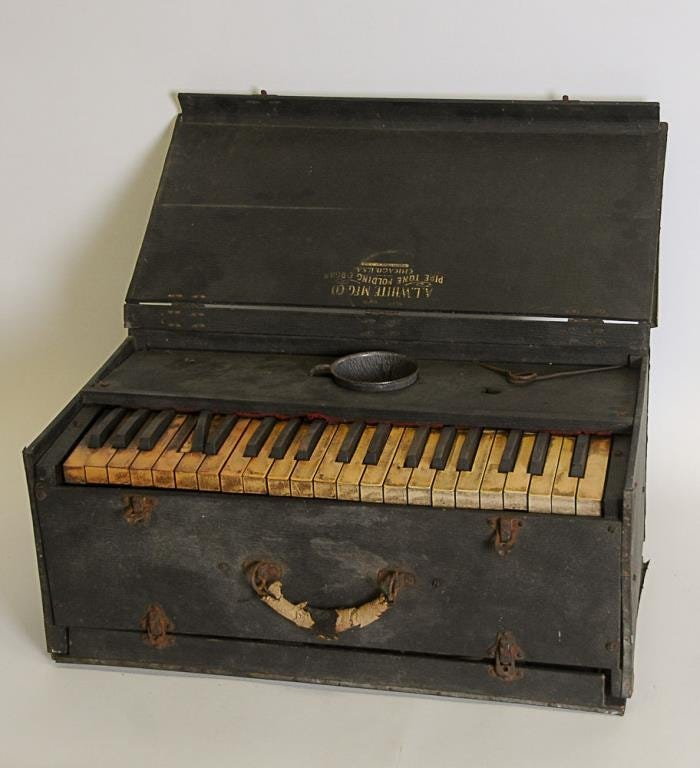
Portable A. L. White Pipe Tone Folding Organ

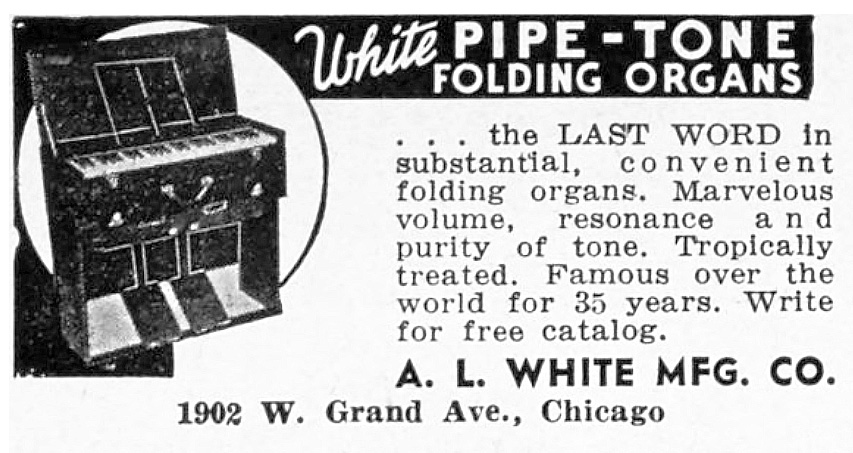
A. L. White advertisement

== Decline and closure ==
The founder, Albert White, was the second president of the Rotary Club of Chicago (1906–07) and a 32nd degree Mason (a member of the Normal Park lodge and the Oriental consistory). He died on July 31, 1938, at the age of 72 and the A. L. White Manufacturing Company fell in decline soon after. It closed in 1946.
