= Elias Hößler =

German organ builder (1663–1746)

Elias Hößler (7 July 1663 in Crimmitschau, Electorate of Saxony – 13 June 1746 in Sulzbach-Rosenberg) was from Saxony originally, active in the Upper Palatinate and Franconia as a pipe organ builder.

He began organ building teaching near Andreas Haß in Greiz in Vogtland, and later moved to Hersbruck. On 21 October 1704, he became a resident of Lauf in der Nähe near Nuremberg. He preferred to work in the Nuremberg area and in the western and central Upper Palatinate. In 1744, he retired to a hospital in Sulzbach-Rosenberg.

== Proven works ==
| Year | Place | Church | Image | Manuals | Register |
|---|---|---|---|---|---|
| 1693/94 | Altensittenbach | St. Thomas | | | |
| 1694 | Ottensoos | St. Veit | | I/P | 6 |
| 1698 | Edelsfeld | St. Stephan | | I/P | 6 |
| 1699 | Velden | St. Maria | | I/P | 8 |
| 1701 | Offenhausen | St. Nikolaus | | | |
| 1701 | Sulzbach-Rosenberg | St. Marien | | II/P | 22 |
| 1710 | Amberg | Salesianerinnenkirche St. Augustinus (Schulkirche) | | | |
| 1714 | Michelfeld | Klosterkirche St. Johann Baptist | | | |
| 1716 | Neukirchen bei Sulzbach-Rosenberg | | | | |
| 1721 | Amberg | Franziskanerkloster (heute Stadttheater) | | | |
| 1723 | Sulzbürg | St. Michael (Schlosskirche) | | | |
| 1725 | Alfeld | St. Bartholomäus | | I/P | 7 |
| 1726 | St. Helena zu Großengsee bei Simmelsdorf | | | I/P | 8 |
| 1726/27 | Happurg | St. Maria und Georg | | I/P | 11 |
| 1729 | Pommelsbrunn | St. Lorenz | | I/P | 10 |
| 1729 | Vilseck | St. Ägidien | | I/P | 11 |
| 1732 | Sulzbach-Rosenberg | Wallfahrtskirche St. Anna | | I/P | 8 |
| 1734 | Eschenau | St. Bartholomäus | | I/P | 10 |
| 1735 | Frohnberg bei Hahnbach | Sanctuary of Our Lady | | I/P | 9 |
| 1736 | Weißenohe | Klosterkirche St. Bonifaz | | II/P | 15 |
| 1737 | Hersbruck | Spitalkirche St. Elisabeth | | I/P | 8 |
| 1738 | Hersbruck | Stadtkirche | | II/P | 17 |
| 1740 | Betzenstein | | | I/P | 10 |
| 1742 | Michelfeld | St. Leonhard | | | |
| 1743 | Neunhof (Lauf an der Pegnitz) | St. Johannis | | I/P | 8 |
| 1743 | Sulzbach-Rosenberg | Spitalkirche St. Elisabeth | | I/P | 9 |
| 1744 | Etzelwang | St. Nikolaus | | I/P | 9 |

== Bibliography ==
- Michael Bernhard: Orgeldatenbank Bayern. Version 5, 2009.
- Hermann Fischer, Theodor Wohnhaas: Orgeldenkmale in Mittelfranken. Schneider/Rentsch, Lauffen 2001, ISBN 3-921848-08-3.
- Geschichte der Orgeln in St. Marien. In: Katholische Pfarrgemeinde St. Marien und Stadt Sulzbach-Rosenberg: 750 Jahre Pfarrgemeinde St. Marien. Sulzbach-Rosenberg 2002, ISBN 3-9804497-9-3, S. 135–150.
- Eberhard Kraus: Historische Orgeln in der Oberpfalz. Schnell und Steiner, München 1990, ISBN 3-7954-0387-1.
- Jörg Schindler: Elias Hößler, Leben und Werk. Facharbeit im Leistungskurs Musik, Amberg 1981.
