= Joseph Casavant =

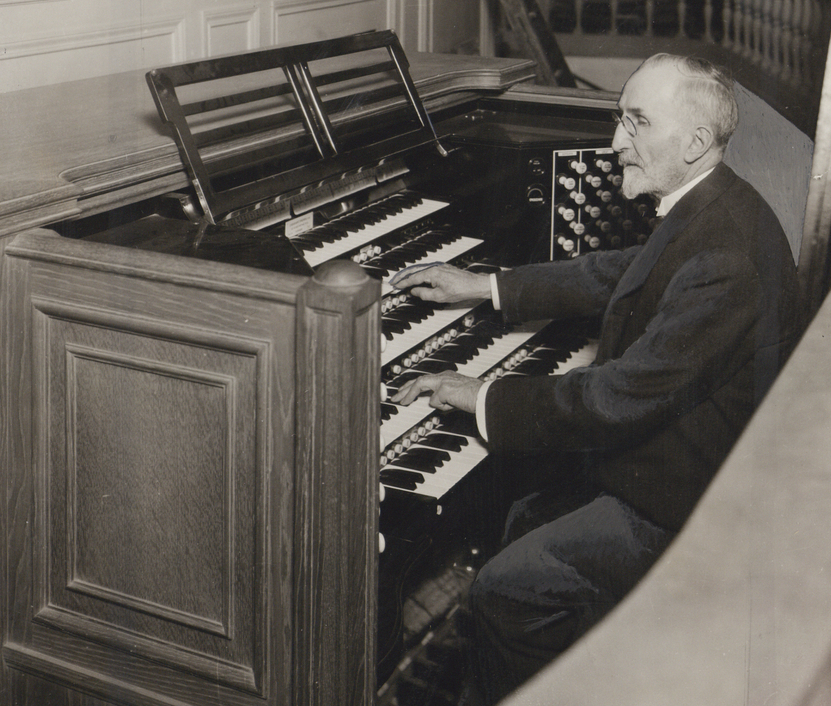
- Born: 23 January 1807; Saint-Hyacinthe, Lower Canada
- Died: 9 March 1874 (aged 67); Saint-Hyacinthe, Quebec, Canada
- Organization: Casavant Frères
- Known for: Pipe organ manufacturing
- Notable work: Ottawa and Kingston cathedral organs
- Spouse: Marie-Olive Sicard de Carufel
- Children: Joseph-Claver; Samuel-Marie

Joseph Casavant (French pronunciation: [ʒozɛf kazavɑ̃]; 1807 – 1874) was a French Canadian manufacturer of pipe organs.

Casavant was born 23 January 1807 in Saint-Hyacinthe, Lower Canada to Dominique Casavant and Marie-Desanges Coderre. Originally a blacksmith, Casavant gave up his trade at age 27 to pursue classical studies in Sainte-Thérèse-de-Blainville. While at Father Charles-Joseph Ducharme's college in 1834, he happened upon a treatise by Dom Bédos de Celles. The 1766 work on organ building was titled L'Art du Facteur d'Orgues (The Art of Organ Building). He subsequently used it to restore the unfinished and abandoned school's organ. News spread throughout the region with the vestry from the Ville de Laval ordering an organ. He set up business in Saint-Hyacinthe and received his first contract in 1840.

In 1850, he received an order for a church organ from Bytown, Canada West. While living there temporarily, he married his second wife Marie-Olive Sicard de Carufel.

By the time he retired in 1866, he had built 17 organs, including the ones for the Catholic cathedrals of Ottawa and Kingston, and the village church in Mont-Saint-Hilaire.

Casavant died in Saint-Hyacinthe on 9 March 1874. His work was carried on by his sons, Joseph-Claver and Samuel-Marie, under the firm name of Casavant Frères. Little of Casavant's work survives today, however the company his two sons established retains the copy of de Celles' work.
