= Benjamin Flight =

English organ builder (1767?–1847)

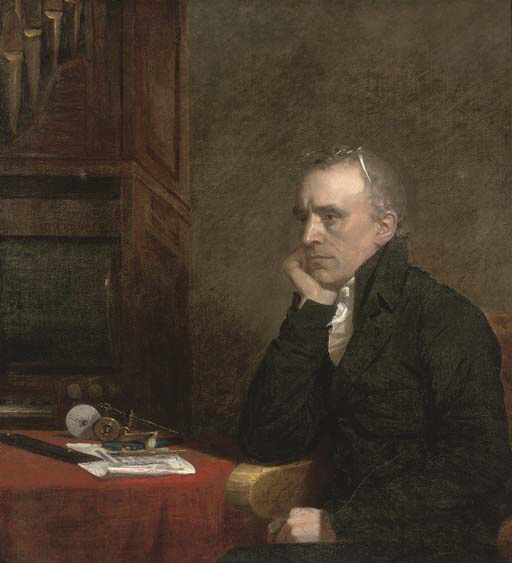
George Dawe: Portrait of Benjamin Flight

Benjamin Flight (c.1767–1847), was an English organ builder and part of the firm Flight & Robson.

Flight was the son of Benjamin Flight (fl. 1772–1805), who belonged to the organ building firm Flight & Kelly. With his son J. Flight and Joseph Robson, Flight constructed the apollonicon, an instrument with five manuals, forty-five stops, and three barrels. This ingenious contrivance was exhibited from 1817 until 1840. The partnership with Robson was afterwards dissolved, but Flight continued to interest himself in certain inventions and improvements in the mechanism of organs.

After his father's death in 1847, J. Flight carried on with the business until 1885.
