= Hendrik Niehoff =

Dutch pipe organ builder (c.1495–1560)

Hendrik Niehoff (c. 1495 – December 1560) was a Dutch pipe organ builder.

== Life ==
Hendrik Niehoff was born in Leeuwarden and served as an apprentice to pipe organ builder Jan van Covelen (c. 1470–1532). After Van Covelen's death, Niehoff established his shop in 's-Hertogenbosch to continue building new and upgrading organs throughout the Netherlands and in major Hanseatic cities, and is considered one of the most significant organ builders in northwestern Europe in the middle third of the 16th century.

== Craftsmanship ==
The pipes in Niehoff's organs use an alloy of over 98% lead, with only about 1.3% tin and minimal amounts of antimony, copper and bismuth. Pipes made of this alloy are noted for producing sounds with the "vocale" characteristic of the organs of the high Renaissance–early Baroque period. To enhance their appearance, the façade pipes were usually covered with thin, bright tin foil, which was held to the underlying lead pipe with a glue made from duck egg white.

American organbuilder John Brombaugh has used several surviving examples of pipes from the 1539 Schoonhoven Niehoff organ as models for many instruments his firm made and used in the organ at Central Lutheran Church, Eugene, Oregon, that was dedicated in 1976. This instrument also uses vertical pallets in its ruckpositive windchest, a method that was common in Niehoff's organs but has been seldom used since.

== See also ==
- List of pipe organ builders
