= Rafael Puignau =

Spanish organ builder (1888–1979)

Rafael Puignau (17 April 1888 - 28 August 1979) was a Spanish organ builder who founded several organ building companies and served as a bridge between the romantic and neoclassical organ building schools.

He worked with many disciples of Aquilino Amezua, considered the main Spanish organ builder of the 19th century, and helped this tradition not to be lost in the hard times after the Spanish Civil War.

His works include most important new organs and restorations in the decades dating from 1920 to 1960.

== Life ==
=== Childhood and organ building apprenticeship ===
Rafael Puignau was born in Castelló d'Empúries (province of Girona) in the region of Catalonia, Spain. From early age, he sang as soprano in the choir of the Santa Maria Basilica. This church has an important four-keyboard organ initially built in 1808 by Dominique Cavaillé-Coll and his father Jean-Pierre Cavaillé, and finished in 1854 by Gaietà Vilardebó. Due to the bad condition of the organ he entered quite frequently into the instrument to fix some little problems with the trackers or the ventil chests of the organ.

At the age of 14, the parish of his village hired Corominas y Riera Company from Barcelona for an important repair of the organ. Mr. Riera and organ builder Pedro Pagès were hosted in the house of Puignau's parents, and noticing the qualities of Puignau for the organ, Pagès asked their parents to take with him to Barcelona as an apprentice.

In the spring of 1903 Puignau arrived to Barcelona to begin apprenticeship in the workshop of Pagès, which manufactured harmoniums for several shops and dealers, and another organ parts as organ chests, keyboards, bellows and so on for other organ builders. For 4 years Puignau learnt all what in that workshop was done, including a good knowledge of carpentry.

In the fall of 1907, Puignau decided to look for job in a different workshop in which he could devote mainly to the organ. In that time, Francisco Aragonés had begun a new commercial venture with Mr. Corominas and Riera. Puignau asked for a job and was immediately accepted.

In that time Puignau lived in the center of Barcelona, and witnessed the construction and opening concert of Palau de la Música Catalana organ by Alfred Sittard and Albert Schweitzer. He also had the opportunity to visit the reform and enlargement of the Beaux Arts Palace organ by Xuclà organ workshop.

In January 1911 Puignau accepted a job offer from Casa Rodríguez in Madrid. This workshop employed around 20 workers and was the most modern in Spain at that time. Almost all the pipework came directly from Laukhuff company in Germany.

=== Senior jobs and move to Guipuzkoa ===
In 1914 Puignau was recruited by Francisco Aragonés as senior organ builder in a new settled organ building company: Viuda de Amezua, Aragonés, Eleizgaray y Cia., in the village of Azpeitia in the province of Gipuzkoa. His main task would be the phonic part of organs, that is to say, everything related to pipes and its harmonization. In 1916 the name of the company changed to Eleizgaray y Compañía. In these years the company grew and several organ builders were recruited, the most important being Albert Merklin (descendant of the famous organ builder Joseph Merklin). Albert Merklin was working in Spain in 1914, and because of I World War decided to stay in here.

On 2 August 1918 her majesty the Queen of Spain Maria Cristina visited the factory to hear an organ concert played by Aramburu, Eleizgaray and Urteaga.

In 1920, due to disagreement with Amezua's widow, the former company was dissolved. Aragonés left Azpeitia and suggested Puignau to return with him to Girona, but Puignau felt comfortable in the Basque Country, and had already found a girlfriend who later became his wife, so he rejected this idea.

The management of the company was shared with Merklin. Other German workers at the company were Juan Melcher and Egidio Keller. Some of the organs built in this period 1914-1925 are: Cathedrals of Zamora, Ourense, Cordoba, and churches of Billabona and Torrelavega.

In 1923 Rafael Puignau and Remigio Eguiguren (brother in law of Eleizgaray) founded a new society called Puignau Olaciregui. Some of the organs made by them were for the parishes of Zestoa, Orio, and Itziar. Eguiguren died in 1926 and Puignau continued managing the company till 1936.

=== Work in France with Víctor González ===
After outbreak of Spanish Civil War, Puignau moved with his family to St. Jean de Luz near the border between Spain and France. In 1937 he worked for Ruche and Guironet, from Lyon, but not being able to get the work permit he came back to St. Jean de Luz.

Shortly after, he received an invitation from Víctor González for working in his workshop by means of a 'stagiaire' letter. These letters were issued by embassies in order to help worker's exchange in different crafts. González was manager of a workshop with around 30 workers, which to a larger extent came for Convers and Cavaillé-Coll Mutin workshops. Puignau describes his works as perfect and remarks they used very good materials.

When Puignau arrived to Casa González the new organ for the Chaillot Palace was already being built. He worked in adjusting the mechanical parts of the instrument (the organ used electric mechanical system).

In 1939 he spent his holidays in St. Jean de Luz with his family and after outburst of WW II he decided not to return to Paris. At the same time he received several invitations to work on different organs in Spain.

=== Work in Organería Española Sociedad Anónima (OESA) ===
In St. Jean de Luz Puignau met a young engineer and organist: Ramón González de Amezua, and in 1941 a new society was founded in Madrid with funds form Ramon's father. The company used the old workshop in Azpeitia but had also offices in Madrid.

Puignau took part in most important projects of OESA in those days, including the construction of the organ of San Sebastian Cathedral (1954), the biggest in Spain with 5 keyboards, pedalboard and 125 stops.

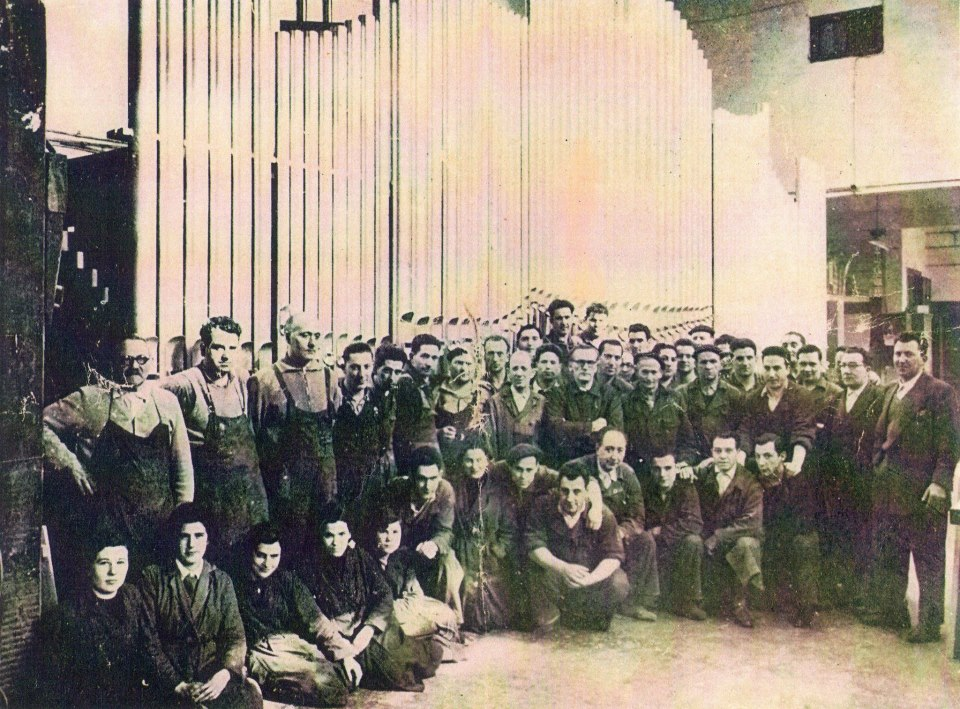
Staff and workshop of Organería Española Sociedad Anónima (OESA) in Azpeitia. Rafael Puignau appears in the center (over the man with beret). José Antonio Azpiazu senior is 3rd from right side

In 1958 Puignau retired from work, but continued to collaborate with OESA in some works as harmonist. From these works the most important was, according to Puignau's opinion, the 1972 year restoration of the Cavaillé-Coll organ (1863) of the Basilica of Saint Mary of the Chorus in San Sebastian.

In 1978 the village of Azpeitia paid homage to Puignau.

Rafael Puignau died in San Sebastian on 28 August 1979.

== Main works ==
- 1916 Transfer to the high choir and restoration of the organ of Hondarribia.
- 1917 New Eleizgaray organ for Santa Maria church in Torrelavega.
- 1919 New Eleizgaray organ for the parish of Billabona.
- 1924 New Albert Merklin organ for Guadalupe Monastery.
- 1927 New Puignau-Olaciregui organ for the parish of Zestoa.
- 1937 New González organ for the Chaillot Palace (Trocadero)
- 1944 New OESA organ for the Jesuit church in Santander.
- 1945 New OESA organ for Pamplona cathedral.
- 1954 New OESA organ for San Sebastian Cathedral
- 1972 Restoration of the Cavaillé-Coll organ of the Basilica of Saint Mary of the Chorus in San Sebastian.
