= South African Organ Builders =

- Formerly: Century Organ Builders
- Industry: Organ building
- Founded: July 1, 1948
- Founder: Willem van Loon
- Headquarters: Pretoria, South Africa
- Area served: Southern Africa
- Services: Organ building, maintenance, restoration

The South African Organ Builders (SAOB), otherwise known as Die Suid-Afrikaanse Orrelbouers, was a South African organ-building firm known for the hundreds of instruments built and maintained by the firm during the twentieth century. Mostly active in South Africa and neighbouring countries, the firm imported—and later built–organs mostly destined for Southern African churches.

== History ==
The firm has its origins in the Century Radio and Tube Co, S.A., a dealership specialising in the sale of radios, pianos and harmoniums. Willem van Loon, a Dutch electrical and mechanical technician who immigrated to South Africa in 1934, operated a subsidiary of the firm. In 1946, Century Radio and Tube Co decided to open an organ-building division, spearheaded by van Loon. The post-war situation in Europe was such that van Loon struggled to source instruments from European builders, eventually concluding that it would be easier to build organs in South Africa. After advertising for new apprentices in January 1948, Century Organ Builders—the SAOB's precursor—was registered on 1 July 1948, operating from a premises on Struben Street, Pretoria. Several organs were built under the name "Century Organ Builders", with certain components imported (like metal pipes, blowers, magnets and keys) and others made in South Africa (like windchests, consoles, wind reservoirs, and casework).

The firm was renamed in July 1950, assuming the name South African Organ Builders. Albert Troskie writes that this change was necessary given the similarity between the name of the radio company and the organ builders, implying that the radio company was no longer a part of the operation. Tenuously branded as "South Africa's first and only Church Organ Factory", the firm entered into a contract in 1950 with E.F. Walcker & Co, providing Walcker organs to South African churches till about 1960.

SAOB moved into larger premises in Silverton, Pretoria, in 1957, owing to an ever increasing demand for new instruments—especially within the three South African Dutch Reformed Churches. In 1964, SAOB started producing metal pipework, an achievement which represented an important landmark for the firm. An article in the Rand Daily Mail on 15 June 1973 reiterates the point by exclaiming that "Pipe Organs Go SA", and noting that the SAOB was building instruments with "more than 80 per cent local content". By 1982, the SAOB found that their premises were yet again too small; the firm's new buildings in Waltloo were opened on 22 January 1982 by the Minister of Industry, Trade and Tourism, Dawie de Villiers. Less than a decade later (1991), the firm moved again to Silvertondale. The demand of the 1950s, 1960s, and 1970s was, however, not to last; by 1998, the Director of the SAOB, Fanie Schoeman, noted that the firm's work had slowed considerably. The firm has since ceased to operate.

== Instruments ==
Troskie writes that while the firm produced many good and several exceptional instruments, an equally large proportion of their output was weak. His writing on the firm characterises three main periods of work: their collaboration with Walcker, producing electrical and electropneumatic instruments only; the 1960s and early 1970s, where the firm produced mostly electric actions, but also producing a few mechanical instruments; the late 1970s and 1980s, where the firm produced quite a large volume of mechanical instruments, in line with European and American practices at the time.

Troskie lists the following notable organs in Pyporrels in Suid-Afrika:

- St Alban's Anglican Cathedral, Pretoria (1958): III/P/40;
- Dutch Reformed Church (NGK), Universiteitsoord, Pretoria (1967): III/P/41;
- Dutch Reformed Church (NGK), Robertson-Oos, Robertson (1964): II/P/28;
- Dutch Reformed Church (NGK), Noord-Oos-Pretoria, Pretoria (1974): II/P/25;
- Dutch Reformed Church (NGK), Valhalla-Suid, Pretoria (1975): II/P/25;
- Dutch Reformed Church (NGK), Montana, Pretoria (1977): II/P/31;
- Dutch Reformed Church (NGK), Kemptonpark-Oos, Johannesburg (1973): II/P/16;
- Dutch Reformed Church (NGK), Potchefstroom-Vyfhoek, Potchefstroom (1983): II/P/20;
- Dutch Reformed Church (NHK), Wapadrant, Pretoria (1984): II/P/22;
- Dutch Reformed Church (NGK), Frankfort (1968): II/P/27;
- Dutch Reformed Church (NGK), Eerste Vesting, Potchefstroom (1989): II/P/32.
