= Heinrich Traxdorf =

German organ builder

Heinrich Traxdorf (Drassdorf, Drossdorf) (dates of birth and death unknown) was an early German organ builder. He was born in Mainz, probably in the beginning of the 15th century. During the 1440s he built three organs in Nuremberg (the large organ of St. Sebaldus Church, destroyed in 1945, and two small organs for the Frauenkirche) and one in Salzburg, for St. Peter's abbey church. Traxdorf was a progressive builder, one of the first to depart from the gothic organ model by dividing the Blockwerk into independent divisions, dividing the chests and separating the front stops into Flute (Principal) and Octave. The instruments had a single manual and pedal, whose ranges were B to d" (manual) and A to b (pedal).

== See also ==
- List of organ builders
