= Gray and Davison =

Organ builders 1841–1973

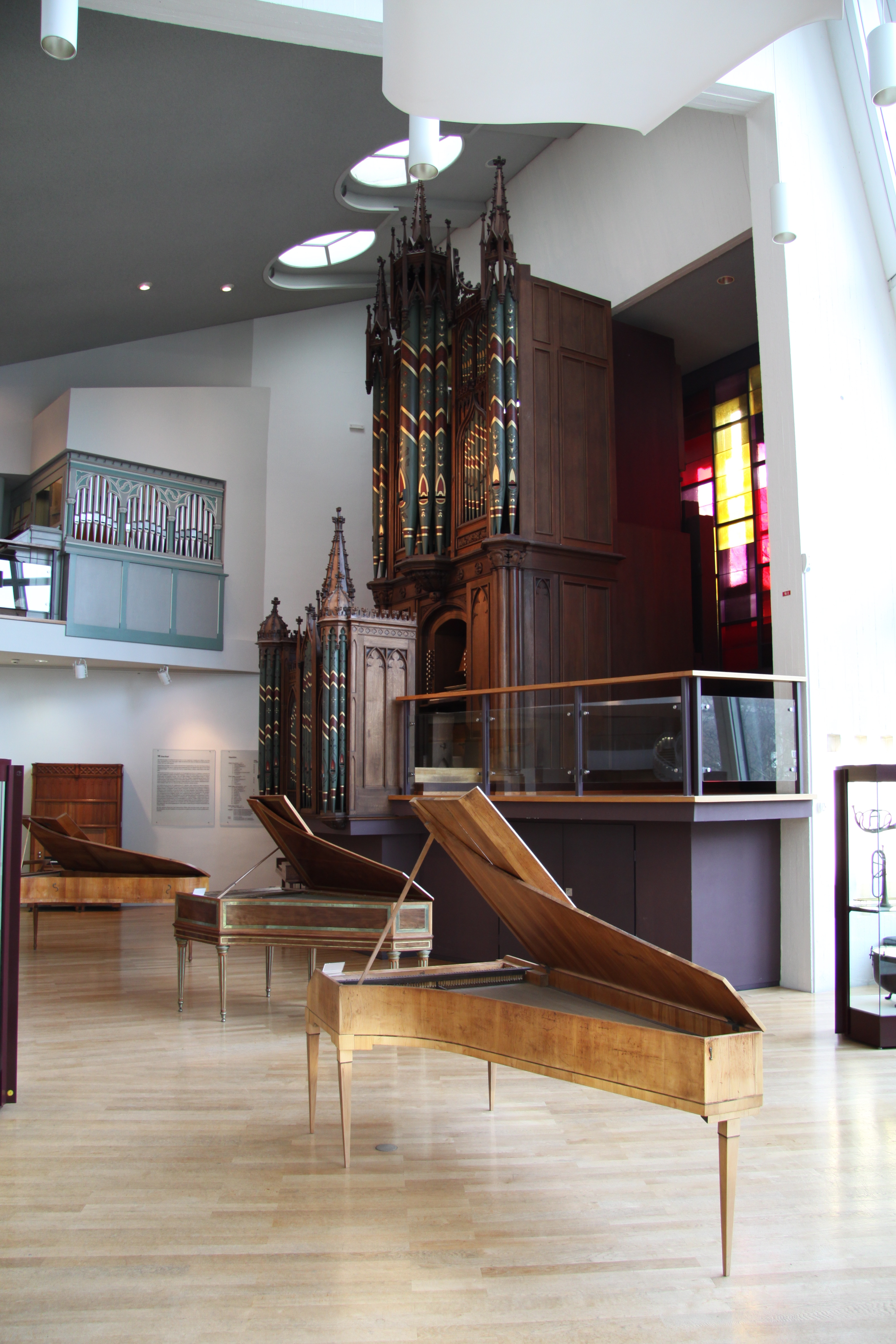
19th-century pipe organ, presumably built by John Gray, in the Berlin Musical Instrument Museum

Gray & Davison was a large-scale manufacturer of church and cathedral pipe organs, based in London. The company was active between 1841 and 1973 and had its heyday between 1905 and 1930.

Organs produced are stamped "John Gray", then later "Gray & Son" and from 1842 onwards as "Gray & Davison".

The company started with Robert Gray (1742–1796), and his partner and brother William Gray (1757–1821). John Gray, William's son inherited the business in 1821 and from 1837 ran it in partnership with Frederick Davison until John Gray's death in 1849.
