= Charles McManis =

American organ builder (1913–2004)

Charles W. McManis (March 17, 1913 – December 3, 2004) was an American organbuilder.

McManis was born in Kansas City, Kansas and received A.B. and Mus. B. degrees from the University of Kansas. He served as an apprentice with Austin Organs, Inc. and in 1938 started his own organbuilding shop in Kansas City, Kansas. While serving in the U.S. military in Europe in World War II he studied organs in England and France; these were described in several articles he wrote for The American Organist. He was a charter member of the Organ Historical Society, and helped found the American Institute of Organbuilders. During his career, which spanned roughly sixty years, he built or restored nearly 140 organs across the U.S. He specialized in voicing techniques that used pipe nicking. In the 1940s he experimented with making pipes from aluminum tubing. He officially retired to California in 1986, but in 1989 rebuilt his 1957 organ at St. John's Episcopal Church in Waterbury, Connecticut, which had been damaged by a tornado.

McManis died in Burlington, Vermont at the age of 91.
