= Matthäus Abbrederis =

Austrian organist and organ builder

Matthäus Abbrederis (1652 – c. 1725) was an Austrian organist and organ builder. Born in Rankweil, he was baptized on 17 April 1652.

Many of his contemporaries in the Rhine Valley, south of Lake Constance, considered him an outstanding master of organ building. Though influenced by the Baroque style of the 17th century, he was not constrained by the version that flourished in South Germany. Many of his organs still survive, such as the one for the monastery church of Pfäfers, Switzerland, built in 1693.
