= Wicks Organ Company =

The Wicks Organ Company is an organ manufacturer in Highland, Illinois in the United States where they build, repair, and restore organs.

== History ==
The Wicks Organ Company was founded by Adolph Wick, John F. Wick, and Louis Wick in the early 1900s at their jewelry and watch making store in Highland, Illinois. A local priest asked John Wick to study organ; he studied organ at St. Louis University, St. Louis, Missouri, and then became the church organist. The church later decided to replace an old reed organ with a pipe organ.

The brothers utilized their skills in watch making, cabinet making, and jewelry to construct a small, two manual and pedal, mechanical action pipe organ for the church. They incorporated as the Wicks Organ Company in 1906.

The Wicks Organ Company invented, patented, and trademarked the Direct Electric chest action. This action was created in 1916 and it is still in use today.

The Wicks opus list encompasses over 6,440 instruments installed mostly in the U.S. In January 2011, the company downsized, outsourcing some of its production to past employees. Third-generation family member Scott Wick is president.

== See also ==
- List of pipe organ builders
