= Organ building =

Profession in music

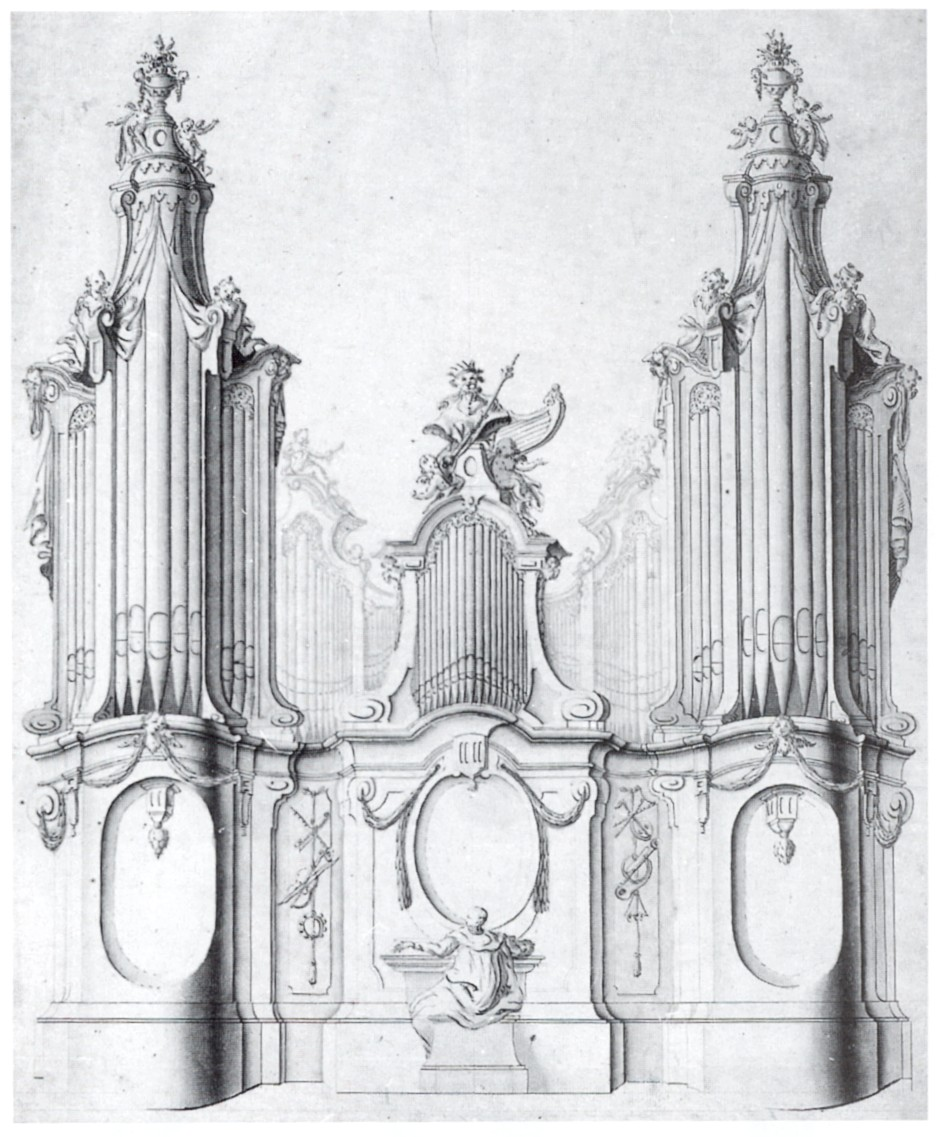
Design for an organ by Johann Georg Dirr, 18th century

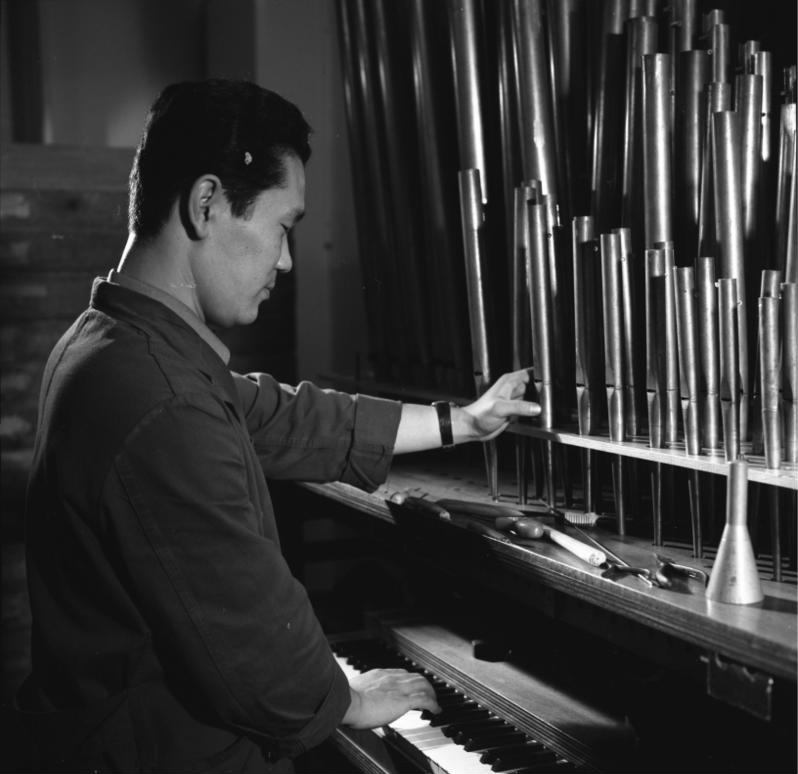
German organ builder pre-voicing pipes, 1966

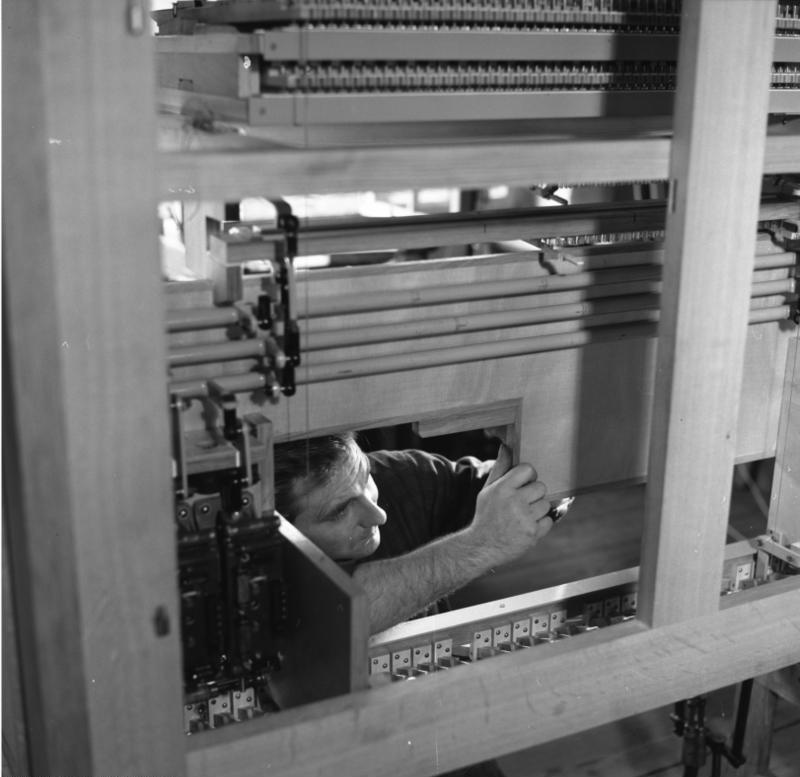
German organ builder constructing an organ, 1966

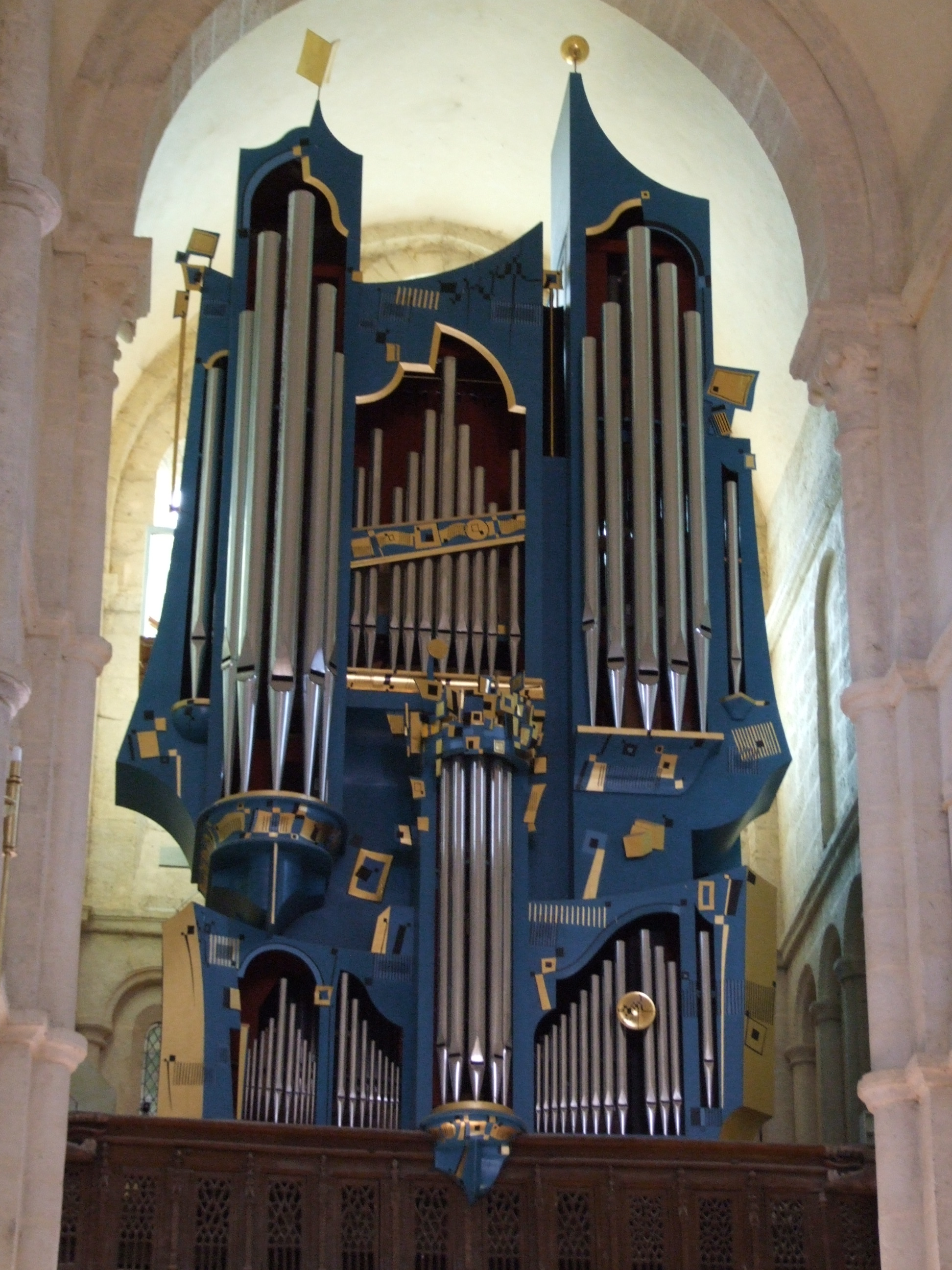
Modern organ in Basilica of St. Andoche, Saulieu, France

Organ building is the profession of designing, building, restoring and maintaining pipe organs.

The organ builder usually receives a commission to design an organ with a particular disposition of stops, manuals, and actions, creates a design to best respond to spatial, technical and acoustic considerations, and then constructs the instrument. The profession requires specific knowledge of such matters as the scaling of organ pipes and also familiarity with the various materials used (including woods, metals, felt, and leather) and an understanding of statics, aerodynamics, mechanics and electronics. However, although in theory the builder is responsible for all facets of construction, in practice organ-building workshops include specialists in pipes, actions, and cabinets; tasks such as the manufacture of pipes, metal casting, and making rarely-used components are often delegated to outside firms.

After manufacture of all parts of a new organ, the pipes must be pre-tuned and voiced to the desired pitch and sound characteristics. The instrument is then usually partly or wholly assembled in the workshop, dismantled, and reassembled on-site, after which the pipes receive a final tuning and voicing.

Organ builders also provide regular maintenance, which includes adjustment of pipes and maintenance of the action, and repairs necessitated by wear and tear, unforeseen problems or rough treatment (including inappropriate temperature and humidity). A complete overhaul of an organ consists of disassembly of the pipes and thorough cleaning of all components and maintenance where needed; changes and additions may also be made to the instrument at the same time. Older organs may also be restored to a previous state, including re-creation of damaged and missing parts using historically accurate materials and techniques.

In some countries, including Germany, Switzerland, and Norway, organ building is a regulated handwork profession.

== See also ==
- List of pipe organ builders
