= Stanford Memorial Church =

Church at Stanford University in California, US

Coordinates: 37.4268°N 122.1705°W

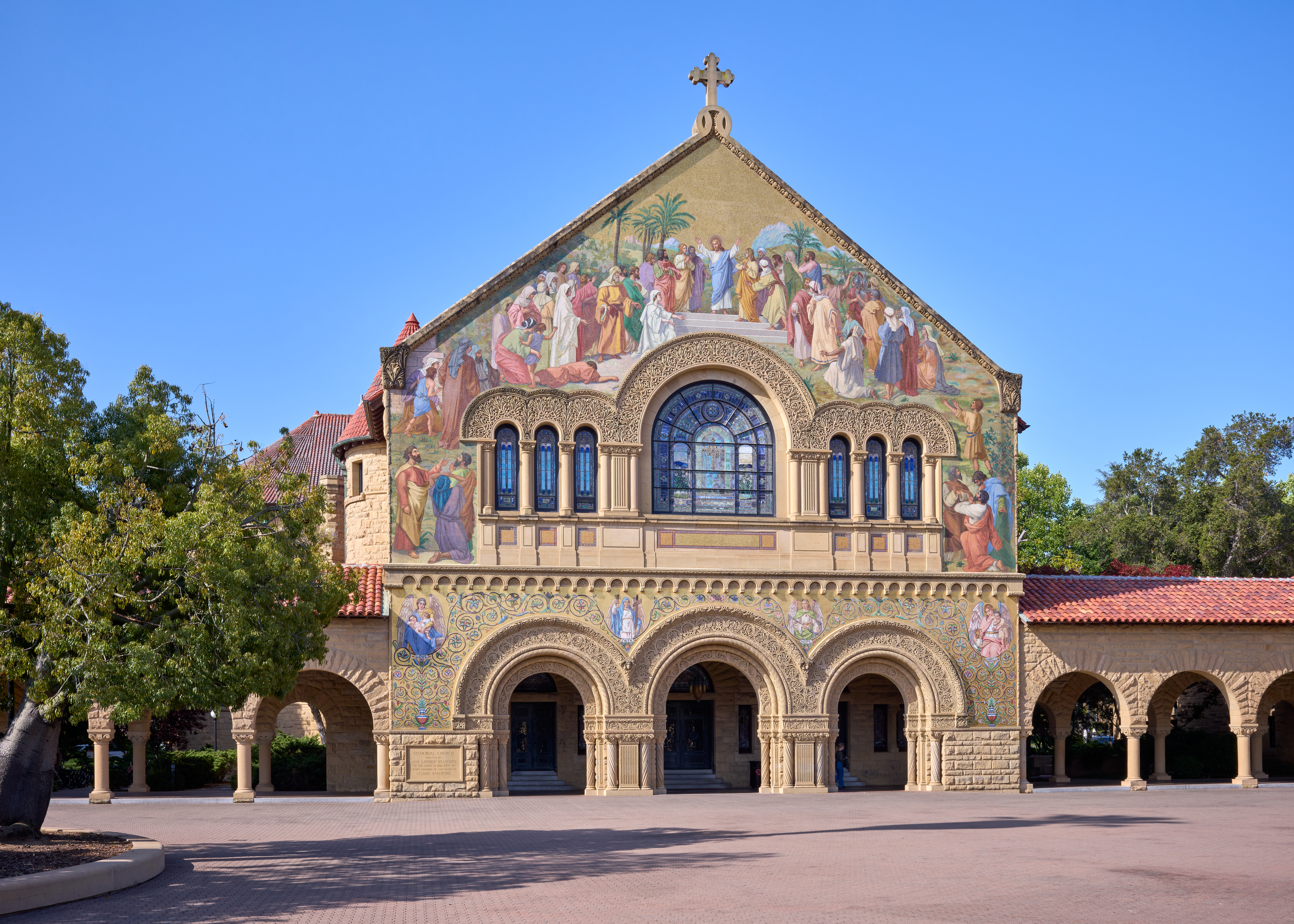
North façade of the Stanford Memorial Church from the Main Quad

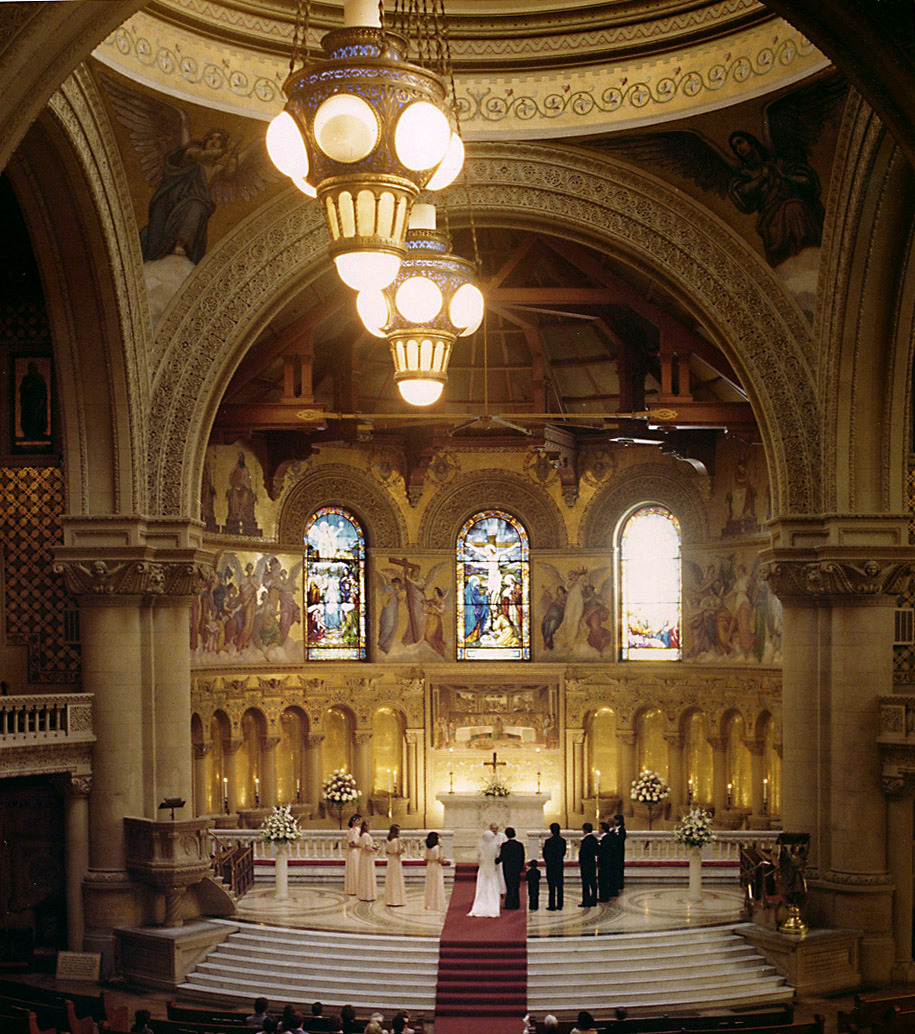
A wedding ceremony in the chancel

Stanford Memorial Church (also referred to informally as MemChu) is located on the Main Quad at the center of the Stanford University campus in Stanford, California, United States. It was built during the American Renaissance by Jane Stanford as a memorial to her husband Leland. Designed by architect Charles A. Coolidge, a student of Henry Hobson Richardson, the church has been called "the University's architectural crown jewel".

Designs for the church were submitted to Jane Stanford and the university trustees in 1898, and it was dedicated in 1903. The building is Romanesque in form and Byzantine in its details, inspired by churches in the region of Venice, especially, Ravenna. Its stained glass windows and extensive mosaics are based on religious paintings the Stanfords admired in Europe. The church has five pipe organs, which allow musicians to produce many styles of organ music. Stanford Memorial Church has withstood two major earthquakes, in 1906 and 1989, and was extensively renovated after each.

Stanford Memorial Church was the earliest and has been "among the most prominent" non-denominational churches on the West Coast of the United States. Since its dedication in 1903, the church's goal has been to serve the spiritual needs of the university in a non-sectarian way. The church's first chaplain, David Charles Gardner, began a tradition of leadership which has guided the development of Stanford University's spiritual, ethical, and academic relation to religion. The church's chaplains were instrumental in the founding of Stanford's religious studies department, moving Stanford from a "secular university" at the middle of the century to "the renaissance of faith and learning at Stanford" in the late 1960s, when the study of religion at the university focused on social and ethical issues like race and the Vietnam War.

== History ==
=== Early history ===
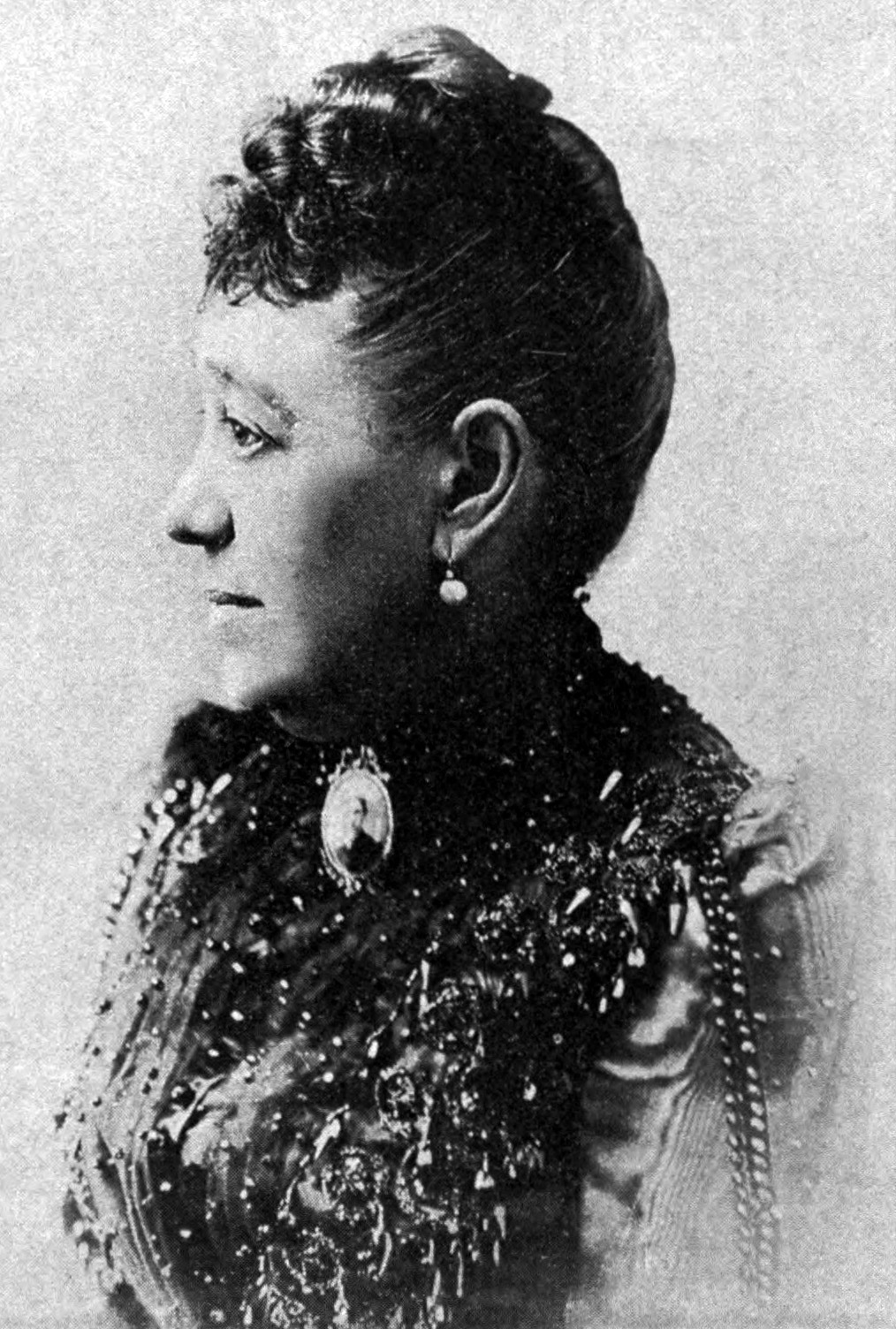
Jane Stanford commissioned the church and its artwork, and said, "While my whole heart is in the University, my soul is in that church".

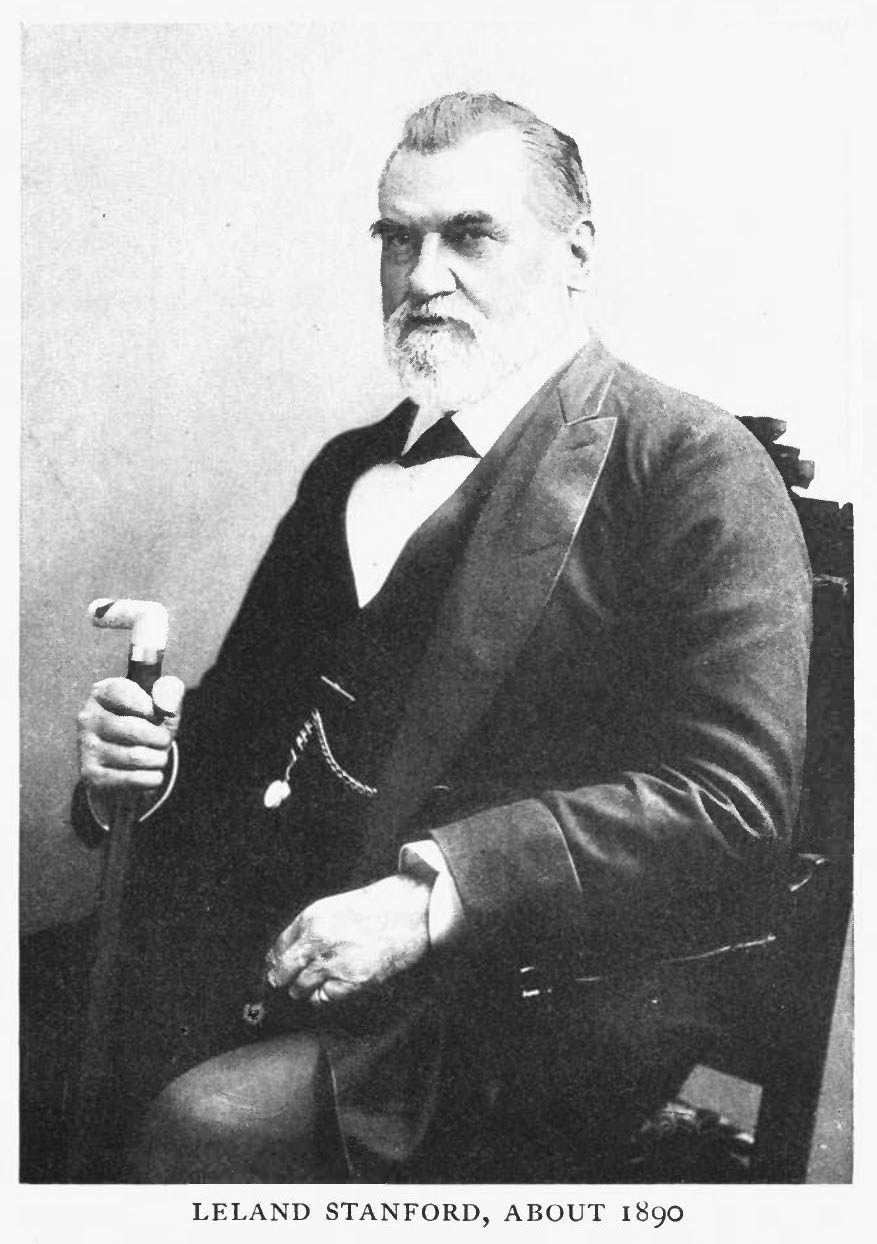
Leland Stanford Sr., in 1890. Stanford Memorial Church is dedicated to his memory.

Stanford Memorial Church is located at the center of Stanford University, and is "the principle building that is seen as the visitor approaches the university along Palm Drive from Palo Alto". It sits the middle of the long southern range of the school's Main Quad. The church was commissioned by Jane Stanford (1828–1905) as a memorial to her husband, Leland Stanford (1824–93). (Note: The Stanfords built the university, which opened in 1891, to honor their only child, Leland Stanford Jr., who died in 1884 of typhoid shortly before his sixteenth birthday. A church had been envisioned but not started when the senior Leland Stanford died in 1893.) The Stanfords had intended that a church should become "the centerpiece of the university complex". They were deeply religious, and for their day and social standing, "open-minded ecumenicalists", so Jane Stanford was determined that a church built on campus be a "nondenominational—if essentially Protestant—house of worship". Robert C. Gregg, who was chaplain of Memorial Church during the 1980s and 1990s, stated that the Stanfords had two objectives in building the church: to ensure that Stanford students had an opportunity to develop their ethics as well as their studies, and to provide comfort and strength to the community.

Leland Stanford died in 1893; legal disputes tied up the Stanford estate and prevented the completion of the university for several years. When the disputes were settled in Jane Stanford's favor, she was finally able to put into motion her wish for a church. In 1898, she and the university trustees requested design submissions for the church. In 1890, Jane Stanford visited her friend Maurizio Camerino in Venice, an artist with a reputation for producing high-quality mosaics; she and her husband had met him years earlier during one of their many trips to Europe. (Note: When the Stanfords' son died in Florence in 1884, Camerino, who spoke fluent English, rushed to their side to help them as an interpreter.) Stanford commissioned Camerino and his company, the Antonio Salviati studios, to produce mosaics for the church. (Note: Salviati & Company also designed and built eight large mosaics in Stanford's museum and decorated the vestibule of the university's mausoleum.) Stanford was involved in every part of the church's design and construction. She was determined that the quality of the stonework of Memorial Church should equal the medieval churches she admired in Europe. (Note: Both Gregg and ceramic expert Joseph Taylor recount what Taylor called the "legend" about Stanford's practice of using her notched parasol to gauge if Memorial Church's stone carvings were as deep as the churches she admired in Europe. Both Gregg and Taylor reported that Stanford would personally examine construction with the church's architect and builder, carrying her parasol and wearing long skirts, even up to the highest scaffolding.) According to Memorial Church chaplain Robert C. Gregg, "The grandeur of the church, articulated in its details, greatly occupied Jane Stanford—the structure was to be without flaw".

Groundbreaking for the church took place in May 1899; construction began in January 1900. After a delay of almost a year, Stanford Memorial Church was dedicated on January 25, 1903, with "impressive ceremonies". Demonstrating Jane Stanford's goal of ecumenicism, Rabbi Jacob Voorsanger of San Francisco's Congregation Emanu-El read the first Bible lesson. The church's pastor, Heber Newton, gave the sermon. A second service was held later that day, and D. Charles Gardner, the chaplain, gave the sermon. Stanford Memorial Church's first christening was held between the two services.

Jane Stanford once remarked: "While my whole heart is in the university, my soul is in that church". She died in 1905, and so did not live to see the damage caused by the 1906 San Francisco earthquake. Her funeral took place in the church, which was called one of her most important accomplishments and "the truest reflection of her visionary leadership", in March 1905. Clergy from several religious traditions, including a Rabbi, a Presbyterian minister, a Methodist minister, an Episcopal bishop, and a Baptist minister, officiated at the service.

=== Earthquakes ===
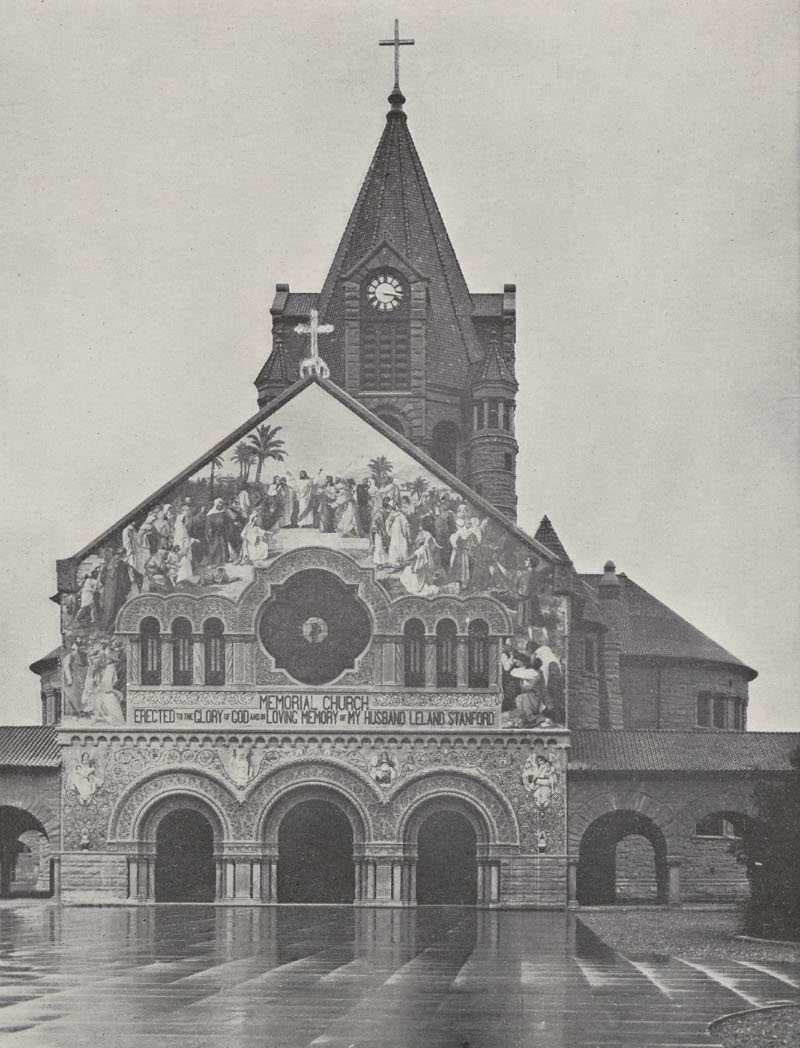
The original church, before the 1906 San Francisco earthquake

Stanford Memorial Church has suffered two major earthquakes, in 1906 and in 1989. Although extensively damaged, the church was restored after each. The 1906 quake wrecked much of the church, felled the spire, cracked the walls, and "injured beyond repair" the mosaics and Carrara marble statuary in the chancel. The main cause of the severity of the damage was that the church's original construction failed to attach the crossing structure to the surrounding masonry and roof structures. When the earthquake hit the church, the crossing structure moved independently from the rest of the building, gouging gaping holes in the roofs over the east and west transepts, the nave, and chancel. Its original 12-sided, 80-foot spire and its adjoining clock tower fell on top of the chancel roof, destroying the tower dome's "frescoed Victorian interpretation of God's eye—complete with tear—surrounded by cherubs and shooting star". The debris hit and destroyed the marble sculptures of the twelve apostles that decorated the altar.

The spire was never repaired and the tower was removed and replaced by a simpler structure; however, the clock was saved and preserved in a temporary structure behind the church before eventually being placed in another building on campus, the Stanford Clock Tower. University trustees considered re-building the tower, and even looked at possible designs, but eventually chose not to rebuild it because they could not agree on its design, and chose instead to replace the tower with a domed skylight. (Note: According to the Stanford Quake ‘06 Centennial Alliance, an organization dedicated to studying the effect of the 1906 earthquake on Stanford University, the choice improved the church's design. The alliance also reported that contemporary engineers praised the quality of the reconstruction, which was said to be the best of its kind at the time.) The crossing structure also pushed the roof of the nave forward. The roof's weak connection to the church's front facade caused the facade to fall into the Inner Quad courtyard; as mosaic expert Joseph A. Taylor put it, "its wondrous mosaic was blown out and totally destroyed". The only mosaics not destroyed in the quake were the four angels that decorated the crossing. The back of the church, with several hundred feet of arcades, was also completely leveled because it too was not joined to the rest of the building.

Repairs of the earthquake damage began in 1908, despite misgivings from some university administration regarding its cost; it was closed between 1906 and 1913 while it was repaired. The university president had to postpone academic projects to pay for the church's restoration, as well as the restoration of the entire campus. Ultimately, they chose to repair Memorial Church because they recognized that it was "integral to the identity of the young university". The church and the Old Chemistry building were the only two buildings in the university's Inner Quad that were repaired. The extent of the damage was such that the church had to be completely rebuilt. The entire church, except for its surviving crossing structure and offices, was dismantled stone by stone, which, along with the windows, were labelled and stored, and were later relaid in their original positions. According to architecture historian Willis L. Hall in his 1917 book about the church, "In reconstruction great care has been taken to assure permanence". The stones were securely bolted to each other, "making the whole structure practically one massive hollow rock on a great steel foundation skeleton". The tile floor was replaced with cork. The building's crossing received a tiled hipped roof and an oculus, which lit the interior of the church, and was added above the renovated dome, which had a frescoed ceiling decorated with bronze designs as opposed to the gold leaf present before the earthquake. The original rose window above the front facade was replaced with one with a simpler arch shape because it was more similar to the style of the rest of the buildings in the Inner Quad.

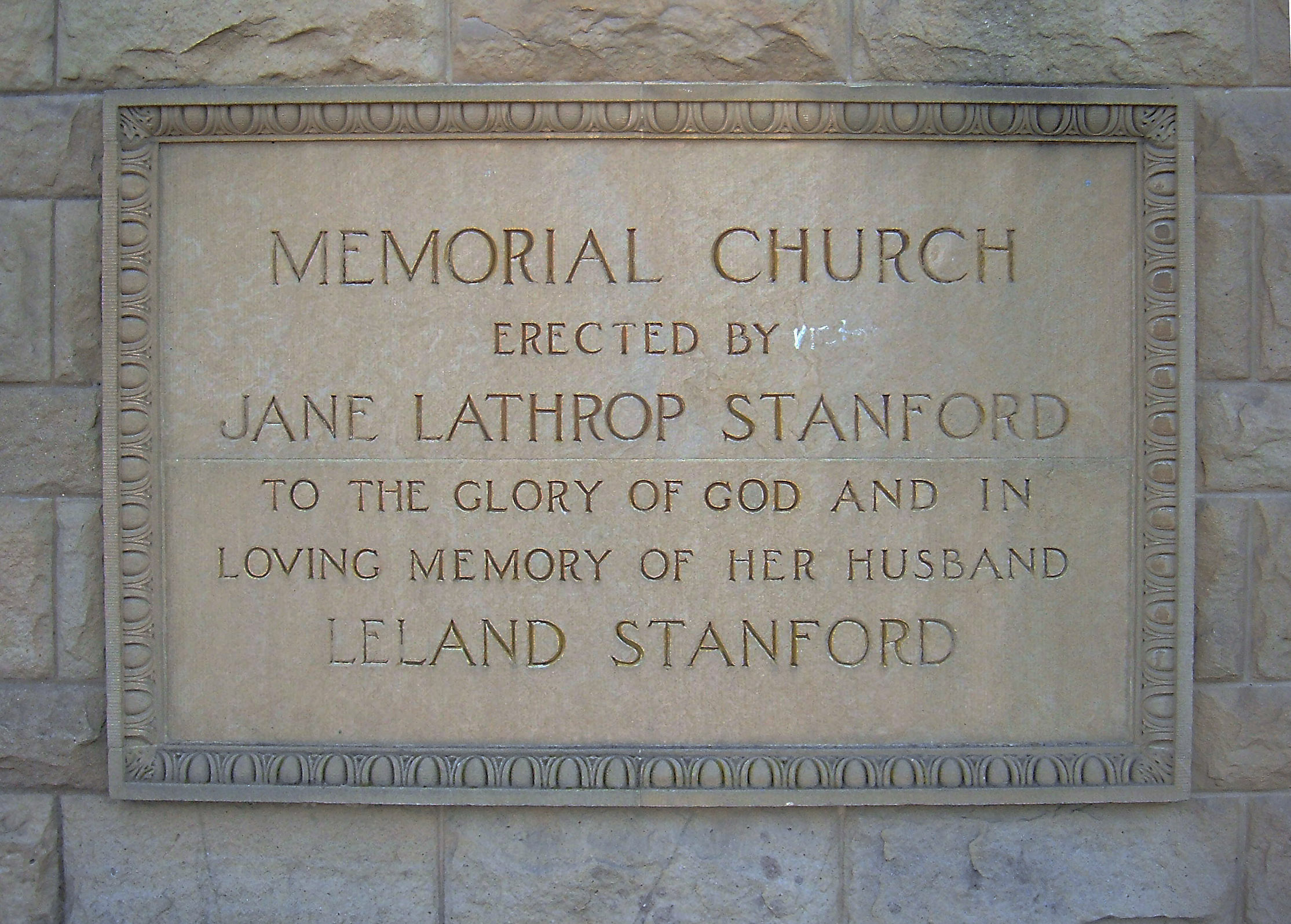
The replacement dedication plaque installed after the 1906 earthquake

The dedication, which was engraved in large letters below the facade mosaic, was replaced by a smaller dedication plaque placed at the lower left of the facade, a choice the university alumni magazine called "a tremendous improvement". Camerino's design of the mosaics that were to fill in the empty space created by the removal of the original dedication, which he offered free of charge, were rejected in favor of a simple version created by John K. Branner (son of university president John Casper Branner) in 1914. Camerino, who did not appraise the damage until 1913, restored the interior mosaics. He had saved the original drawings in Venice, so he removed and re-fabricated the chancel mosaic, and redesigned the entire exterior mosaic. The Stanford alumni magazine, in early 1917, after the completion of the interior mosaics, declared the renovation complete, stating that "the church, for almost the first time since it was begun, is finished". Its appearance after the renovation was "significantly transformed".

In 1989 the church was damaged again, in the Loma Prieta earthquake. Although the damage was not as serious as the '06 earthquake, it "spurred intricate strengthening and restoration work" to protect further damage from future earthquakes. The Stanford Quake ‘06 Centennial Alliance stated that the damage was not devastating, even though the building did not fulfill the more stringent earthquake codes in place in 1989, because of the previous renovation after the '06 earthquake. The Alliance also stated that if the earthquake had been stronger or lasted longer, the damage would have been more extensive. The integrity of the structure remained, but the crossing structure, the only major part of the building that was not dismantled and replaced after the 1906 earthquake, buckled and caused several stones in the north and west arches to slip as much as 2 inches (5.1 cm).

The four mosaic angels in the pendentives, which decorated its high rounded walls directly below the church's dome and served as the setting beds for hundreds of thousands of tesserae, were severely damaged. Parts of the fallen mosaics were stolen, but later returned anonymously. The angels' damage caused large chunks of mortar and glass to fall to the floor 80 feet (24 m) below, while other sections "were left hanging by the sheer geometry of their arched shape". An eight-foot mosaic section of an angel's left wing in the church's northeast corner fell 70 feet (21 m) to the floor. Several stones from the east arch wall fell onto pews in the balcony, and the organ-loft railing collapsed inward. Although the damage was minor, the church remained closed until 1992 while restoration, as well as a bracing project to protect the building from future earthquakes, without changing the building's decorations, was carried out. The university hired a team of contractors, structural engineers, architects, and conservation specialists to develop a renovation plan, which was paid for by a $10 million fundraising drive. Many donations came from undergraduates, and the university's board of trustees approved the plan before its funding was in place because they recognized the church's importance to Stanford.

In this restoration, the entire crossing was strengthened by bracing it behind the dome and securing it to the superstructure of the building. The restoration team evaluated every decoration in the church and made improvements and changes as necessary, in order to preserve the building's interior elements. They also discovered that the crossing's four large arches were hollow; they also found remnants of the steel frame that supported the original clock tower within a 20" void space in the church's arched walls. They had to fill the void with more than 470 tonnes of concrete and several layers of reinforcing steel in order to improve the walls' stability, an accomplishment the Alliance called "one of the most challenging retrofit feats implemented at Stanford".

The roofs, which had not been replaced since 1913, were rebuilt with plywood diaphragms, 30,000 new red clay tiles were installed, and the stones from the decorative arches were reinserted. The wing of the damaged angel was restored; Stanford University hired William Kreysler and Associates to create a new backing system to secure this angel and three other mosaic angels to the base of the dome, which included replacing the original bonding materials (a weak lime mortar), with steel angles that anchored the mosaics to the walls and with a stronger polymer resin. (Note: William Kreysler described the repair in detail in Flash Point Magazine in 2013.) The renovators found a piece of the original mosaic from the vestibule wall, which had a Chi Rho design, in the foundation, and inserted it into the Communion Table in the chancel, linking the current building with the pre-1906 church. The Victorian chandeliers were repaired and rewired, and the transept balconies, which had been closed for twenty years because they were declared unsafe, were reopened, after the false doors on the south side of each balcony were replaced by emergency exits and connected to existing staircases on the other side of the wall. A new sprinkler system and a new audio system was also installed. Stanford Memorial Church was rededicated by chaplain Robert C. Gregg on November 1, 1992.

=== Influence ===
Gifted as a preacher as well as a jazz pianist, [B. Davie] Napier turned the chapel into what some regarded as Christian theater—the introduction of jazz and other types of experimental worship as well as provocative preaching. Suddenly a jam-packed Memorial Church became the fashionable place for undergraduates to congregate on weekends.

— Stanford professor Dr. Van Harvey

According to Stanford professor Van Harvey, Stanford "had the reputation of being a completely secular university" before the 1950s, calling the period a "background of aggressive secularism and the almost complete neglect of the academic study of religion". In 1946, Merrimon Cuninggim, a visiting chaplain at Stanford Memorial Church, criticized the serious lack of religious and spiritual resources available at Stanford for its students and criticized the university's lack of academic courses offered in the study of religions. Cuninggim insisted that the university's administration and trustees were responsible because they had interpreted the non-sectarian clause in Stanford's charter in "a negative and restrictive fashion rather than as enabling the tolerance and the flourishing of many religious faiths on campus".

Cuninggim also charged that Stanford's religious policies were inadequate compared to other prominent U.S. universities. Two attempts were made to found a seminary to train pastors and religious leaders at Stanford, in 1921 and in 1940, but both failed. Harvey speculated that if Stanford had established a seminary like other prestigious universities, its religious studies department and the "ethos" of the entire institution would be different. In 1966, however, the university's board of trustees got a court order that allowed them to change the non-sectarian clause in Stanford's charter so that they could expand the university's religious program, which included permitting sectarian worship services at Stanford Memorial Church.

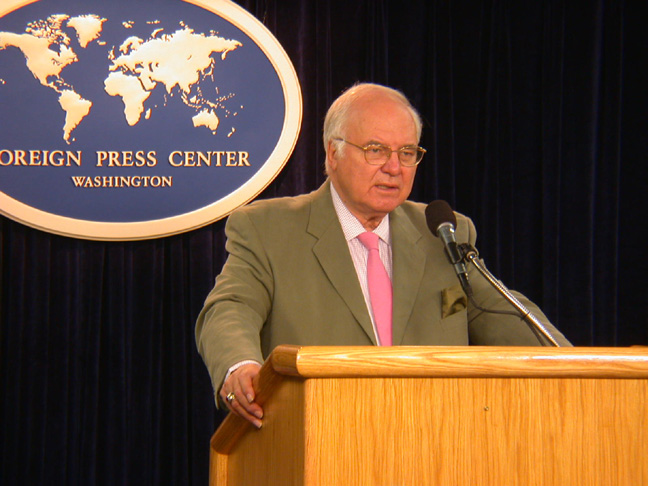
Michael Novak (shown here in 2004), has been one of the many speakers at Stanford Memorial Church in its history.

Stanford did not employ a full-time professor in religion until 1951 and did not establish a religious studies department until 1973, later than most other universities in the U.S. Earlier courses in religion were largely offered by the chaplains of Stanford Memorial Church. David Charles Gardner offered a course in Biblical history and literature beginning in 1907, and by 1910, he was teaching New Testament Greek and Bible classes. Gardner's successor, D. Elton Trueblood, whose goal was the establishment of a non-denominational graduate school in religious studies at Stanford, taught classes about the philosophy of religion. In 1941 Trueblood's efforts to expand the study of religion resulted in the creation of a minor in religion, as well as twenty-one courses offered by him and four faculty members. By 1960, the chaplains of Stanford Memorial Church no longer had to run the program, which had expanded to allow students the option of majoring in the study of religion. By the mid-1960s, the religious studies program at Stanford was enjoying "enormous success".

In the 1960s, the study of religion at Stanford began to focus more on social and ethical issues like race and the Vietnam War. Leading this focus was Stanford Memorial Church Dean of the Chapel and Professor of Religion B. Davie Napier, who was "a powerful critic of U.S. policy in Vietnam". Napier, along with Stanford professors Michael Novak and Robert McAfee Brown, who had previously been faculty members of seminaries, were the subject of a Time Magazine article in 1966, describing "the renaissance of faith and learning at Stanford". Students crowded into the church to hear anti-war speeches by them, as well as by "notables" such as Linus Pauling and William Sloan Coffin. Harvey credited Napier for making the church a popular meeting place on campus for undergraduates and for turning it into "Christian theater—the introduction of jazz and other types of experimental worship as well as provocative preaching".

Stanford University was the first major educational institution in the United States that conducted same-sex commitment ceremonies at its chapel. Its first ceremony was held in 1993, and was officiated by Associate Dean Diana Akiyama. In 2017, a campus organization attempted to have Stanford Memorial Church declared a sanctuary church for the undocumented immigrant student population, but was unsuccessful due to university policies regarding the status of the church as part of the university.

=== Chaplains ===
Stanford Memorial Church, throughout its history, has been served by chaplains who have been influential amongst the Stanford University student body and community at large. R. Heber Newton, "distinguished writer" and former rector at All Souls Church in New York, was handpicked by Jane Stanford to serve as the church's first pastor; he resigned after four months in 1903 "because he disagreed with Mrs. Stanford on some aspects of church management". According to Stanford biographer Robert W. P. Cutler, "Newton's tenure had been a disappointment to Mrs. Stanford". David Charles Gardner, who replaced Newton, served the church from 1902 to his retirement in 1936. Stanford also handpicked Gardner as Newton's assistant because she was impressed with his "parish work" in Palo Alto. Gardner went on to teach courses in Biblical history and literature at Stanford. Influential English professor and Stanford historian Edith R. Mirrielees called Gardner "a preacher of only indifferent ability", but considered him "a strength to the whole university". Mirrieless considered Gardner the prime mover behind the creation of the Stanford Home for Convalescent Children, established in 1919, which eventually became the Lucile Packard Children's Hospital.

D. Elton Trueblood, a lifelong Quaker, was the church's chaplain from 1936 to 1946. Trueblood was also a professor of philosophy of religion at Stanford and established the university's first major in religious studies; his tenure there provided him with "the public visibility and financial freedom that made a national ministry possible". He wrote 33 books, including one about Abraham Lincoln. Trueblood and his wife hosted monthly Friends meetings in their home, and met weekly with Orthodox Jewish students in the vestry of Stanford Memorial Church. George J. Hall was the church's chaplain from 1946 to 1947, followed by Paul C. Johnson, who served between 1949 and 1950. Robert M. Minto was chaplain twice, in 1947–1948, and again from 1950 to 1973. Minto, an associate chaplain at Stanford for two years prior, was a pastor in Scotland and a former British naval chaplain during World War II.

Stanford's next two chaplains, B. Davie Napier (Dean of the chapel, 1966–72) and Robert McAfee Brown (Acting Dean of the chapel, 1972–73), were among the most politically active chaplains. Napier was an ordained Congregational minister. He was born in China to missionary parents, grew up in the American South, and went to seminary at Yale. He became known at Stanford "for his efforts to relate Scripture to the turbulent political times of the late 1960s". Napier was a "charismatic biblical scholar ... [and] a powerful critic of U.S. policy in Vietnam". Napier was also a "gifted" preacher and jazz pianist. Brown, the author of 29 books, became "an international leader in civil rights, ecumenical and social justice causes". He also protested U.S. involvement in Vietnam and taught religion and ethics in relation to contemporary life and literature.

Robert Hamerton-Kelly (1972–86), born in South Africa, was a United Methodist minister. He taught religion, classics, and Greek at Stanford. Thomas Ambrogi was acting dean for "a challenging year" in 1986. Robert C. Gregg (1987–98) was born in Texas and ordained as an Episcopal priest. He was also professor of religious studies (now emeritus). (Note: Gregg also wrote Glory of Angels, the 1995 book about MemChu.) Kelly Denton-Borhaug (1999–2000), a Lutheran minister, came to Stanford in 1996 as an associate dean. The Rev. Scotty McLennan (2001–2014), a Unitarian Universalist minister, was "an activist neighborhood lawyer" in Boston before becoming a university chaplain, first at Tufts University. Garry Trudeau, who was McLennan's roommate when they were students at Yale University, based his Doonesbury character, the Rev. Scot Sloan, in part on McLennan. He was replaced by the Very Rev. Jane Shaw, an Episcopal priest and "a historian of modern religion", in the fall of 2014.

==== Staff ====
Stanford Memorial Church is run by the Stanford Office for Religious Life, headed by the current Dean for Religious Life, Tiffany Steinwert. She replaced the Very Rev. Prof. Jane Shaw who was the dean for 4 years, 2014–18. Rabbi Patricia Karlin-Neumann serves as Senior Associate Dean. Stanford has two associate deans: the Rev. Joanne Sanders and Sughra Ahmed.

Rabbi Karlin-Neumann is Stanford's first associate dean from outside the Christian tradition. Before coming to Stanford, Karlin-Neumann had been a Hillel director and chaplain at UCLA, the Claremont Colleges, and Princeton, and was a rabbi in Alameda, California. She has taught courses in Jewish feminism, rabbinical ethics, education, and social justice. The university changed the title of her position to accommodate a Jewish rabbi, from "Associate Dean of Memorial Church" to "Associate Dean of Religious Life at Stanford". She calls her title at Stanford "Mem Chu and a Jew, too".

Joanne Sanders, an Episcopal priest, has worked at Stanford since 2000. She has degrees in theology, sports administration and physical education. She "provides liturgical leadership for Memorial Church on campus for a variety of religious and other events".

Muslim dean Sughra Ahmed was appointed in 2017, for the purpose of, as Provost Persis Drell stated, to assist "the Stanford community develop a broader understanding of the Islamic faith, particularly at this time". She was named Muslim Woman of the Year in the United Kingdom in 2014, and is a recognized Muslim leader.

Robert Huw Morgan, a native of Wales, has been Stanford Memorial Church's organist since 1999. He attended St John's College, Cambridge, where he was an organ scholar, and earned two doctorates at the University of Washington in Seattle, where he served on staff as a pianist and conductor. At Stanford, he serves as a lecturer in organ, director of the Stanford University Singers, and director of the Memorial Church Choir.

== Murder of Arlis Perry ==
Arlis Perry, a 19-year-old who lived on-campus, was murdered there on October 12, 1974.

== Architecture ==
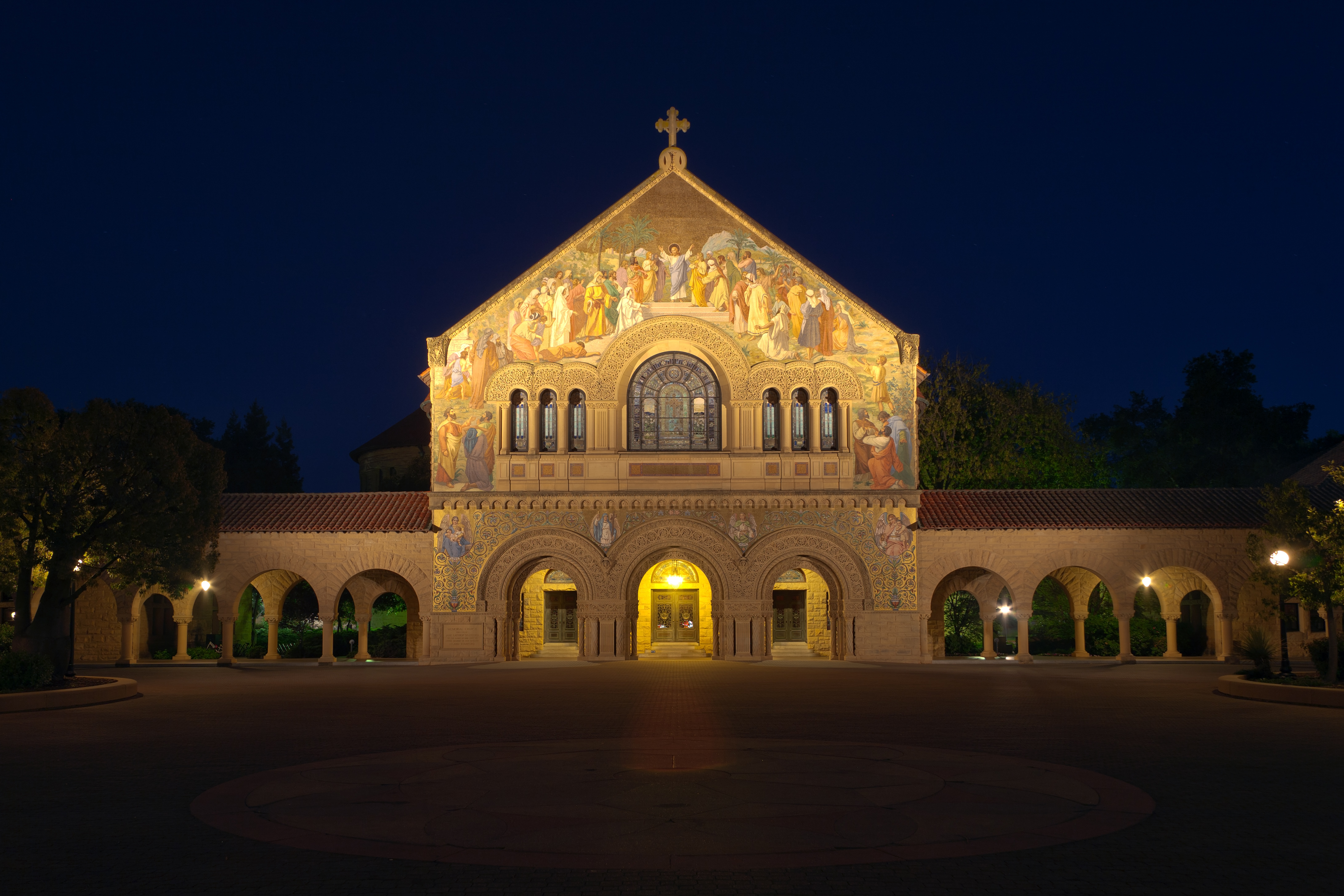
Memorial Church at night

Stanford Memorial Church is part of a linked, complex system of arcades that make up the Quad, which serves to unify the entire complex, is more reminiscent of European public spaces than American ones, and "is probably one of the most important feature of the original Stanford architecture". It was built during the American Renaissance period. Gregg called the church "a perfect example of the movement", with elements of the Renaissance, Byzantine and Medieval art, the Romanesque period, and the Pre-Raphaelites. The architectural style of Stanford Memorial Church has been referred to as "a stunning example of late Victorian ecclesiastical art and architecture with echoes of Pre-Raphaelitism". Stanford historian Richard Joncas called the church "an opulent example of high Victorian architecture with sumptuous materials and arts".

The original designs for Memorial Church and much of the university were made in 1886 by prominent American architect Henry Hobson Richardson; when he died that same year, his student Charles A. Coolidge completed them. Coolidge loosely based his design of Memorial Church on Richardson's design of Trinity Church in Boston. The church's heavy red tile roofs, round turrets, low arches, and rough-hewn stonework matches the design of other buildings in the Quad. After Jane Stanford's legal difficulties after her husband's death were resolved, she hired San Francisco architect Clinton E. Day to review and update the church's blueprints. Charles E. Hodges was the supervising architect for the project. Jane Stanford hired builder John McGilvray, who was responsible for constructing the St. Francis Hotel, the City Hall complex in San Francisco, and much of Stanford University, for the actual construction of Stanford Memorial Church.

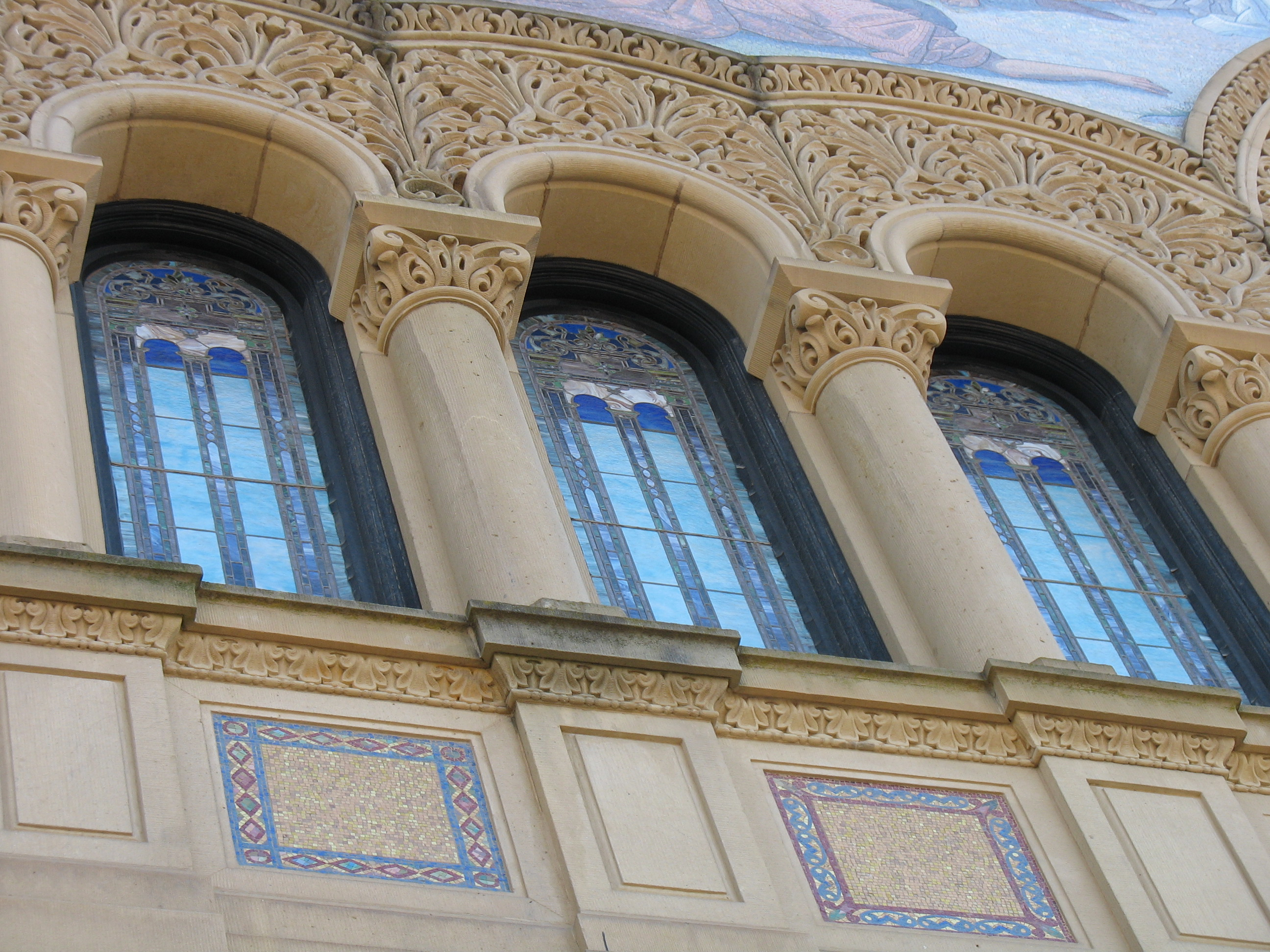
Details of the upper windows of the facade

Jane Stanford's taste and knowledge of both contemporary and classical art is evident in several aspects of the plan, appearance, and architecture of the church, which "dazzle the eye yet also produce an atmosphere of quiet contemplation". According to Joncas, "the church emulates the 'glorious color' of the great European cathedrals", especially those in Italy. Although the iconography in the church is Christian, Stanford was a "late Victorian progressive", and chose the art less for its religious themes and more for its "humanitarian ethics". She requested that the designs include women, "to show the uplifting influence of religion for women"; Architectural historian Willis L. Hall claims that there are more depictions of women than in most church imagery at the time. Art historian Judy Oberhausen reports that Stanford used compendium of biblical illustrations like The Story of the Bible by Charles Foster, which contained 300 illustrations and summarized the events and stories she wished to depict in the church's windows and mosaics.

Jane Stanford's design included inspirational messages placed throughout the church in the form of inscriptions carved into its walls and enclosed in carved frameworks. As Barbara Palmer of the Stanford Report stated, Stanford "had her religious beliefs literally carved into the church's sandstone walls". For example, the following quotations can be found in the church's east transept: (Note: For a complete list of the inscriptions, see Hall pp. 39–45.)

Religion is intended as a comfort, a solace, a necessity to the soul's welfare; and whichever form of religion furnishes the greatest comfort, the greatest solace, it is the form which should be adopted be its name what it will.

The best form of religion is trust in God, and a firm belief in the immortality of the soul, life everlasting.

=== Plan ===
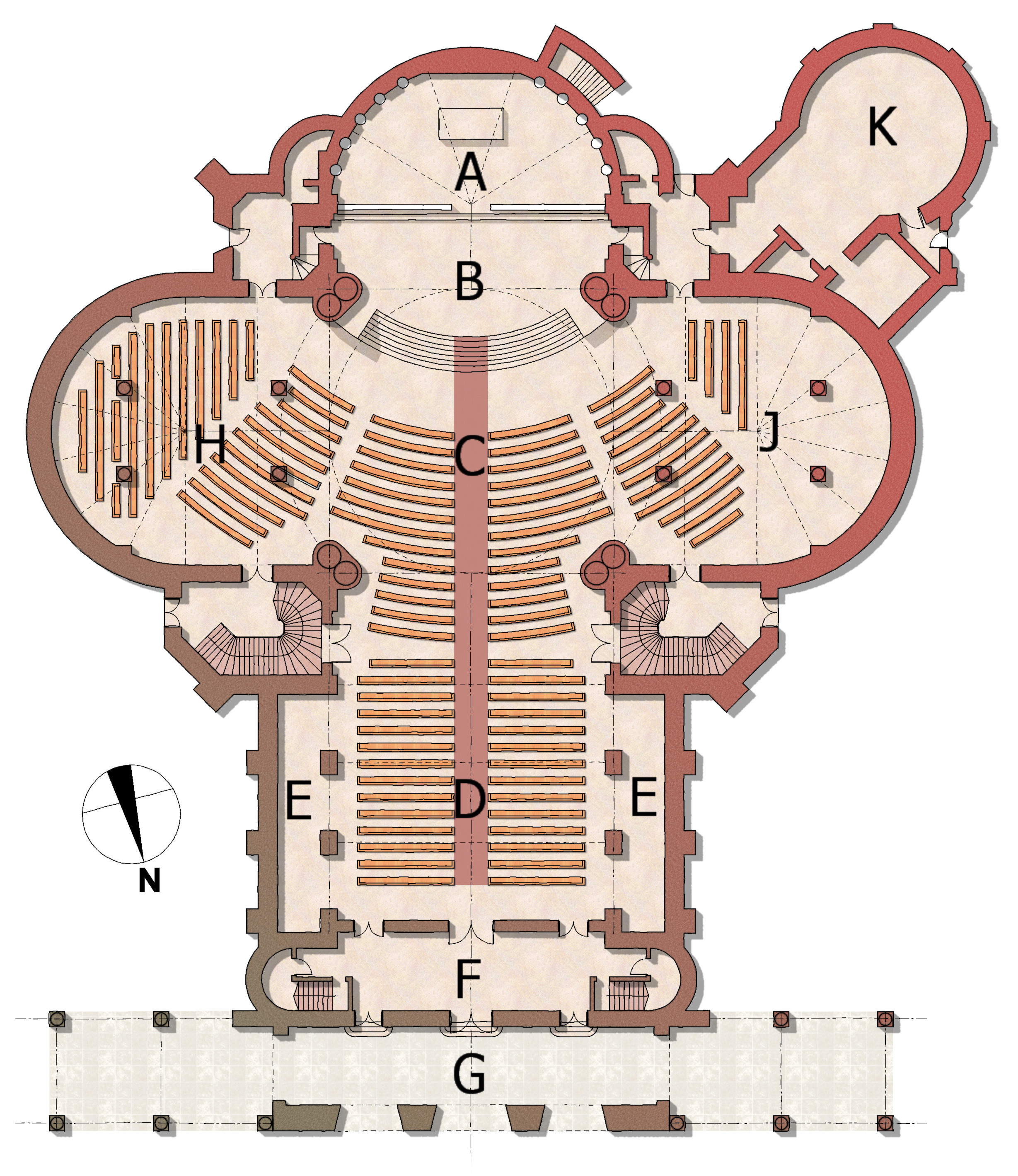
Plan of the Stanford Memorial Church: A: Altar; B: Chancel; C: Crossing; D: Nave; E: Aisles; F: Vestibule; G: Arcade; H: East transept with transept gallery above; J: West transept/side chapel with transept gallery above; K: Round room

The church is a cruciform structure; its original structure, which included a clock and bell tower with an 80-foot (24 m) spire, was 190 feet (58 m) long and 150 feet (46 m) wide. The facade faces the Inner Quad, and is connected to other buildings by arcades which extend laterally. The entry is through a narthex or vestibule extending across the building. The nave has a single aisle on either side, separated by an arcade with a clerestory above it. The crossing is formed by a structure of square plan which once supported the central tower. Over it is a shallow dome supported on pendentives and rising to a skylit oculus. High semicircular Romanesque arches separate the crossing from the nave, transepts and chancel. The chancel and transepts are apsidal. There are deep galleries with concave balustraded fronts in the transepts and an organ gallery above the narthex. The sanctuary, in the chancel, is elevated and approached by steps. A round-shaped room is at the back of the building, added in 1902 by architect Clinton Day.

=== Exterior ===
The chief building material of the church is buff sandstone, which came from the Goodrich Quarry (also called the Greystone Quarry) in the Almaden area of San Jose, was delivered by train and rough-cut in the university Quad. Gregg credits the high quality of the stonework to church and university builder John D. McGilvray. The church is roofed with terracotta tiles of the Italian imbrex and tegula form. The nave, chancel, and transepts appear to project from the square central structure, roofed with tiles and a small skylight above its center. Memorial Church originally had a central bell tower with an 80-foot tall, twelve-sided spire, but this was lost as a result of the 1906 earthquake.

The church's facade is surmounted by a simple Celtic cross, a motif that appears several times throughout the building. The cross was added after the 1906 earthquake; its central shaft was destroyed in the Loma Prieta earthquake and replaced. There are three arched entrances below the exterior mosaic; the central one is slightly larger than the others. The surrounding stonework is intricately carved with stylized flora, twisted-cable moldings, and bosses of sculpted cherubim, a motif which occurs in different media throughout the church. In the spandrels are mosaic depictions of the biblical concepts of love, faith, hope and charity intertwined in a vine representing the "tree of life". (Note: Love is represented by a mother with wings encircling children.)

In the upper zone of the facade, surrounded by more elaborate stonework and "lacy carving", is a large central window, with groups of three smaller windows on each side. The original central window was a quatrefoil-shaped rose window, but after the 1906 earthquake, it was replaced by a "classical round-head window that more grandly restates the smaller flanking, articulated openings" and that corresponded with the mission-style architecture of the Quad. Beneath the windows are inlaid panels of colored marble.

The gable and surrounding surfaces contain the church's largest mosaic, created by Maurizio Camerino's studio, which they rebuilt after the 1906 earthquake. Measuring 84 feet (26 m) wide at the base and 30 feet (9.1 m) in height, at the time of its completion, it was the largest mosaic in the U.S. It depicts a group of men, women and children, 47 in all, surrounding and "paying close heed" to Christ, the mosaic's central figure, and includes a landscape with "waving palms and a gleaming sky" behind Christ. The exterior mosaic took 12 men two years to complete.

After Jane Stanford's death, the mosaic popularly gained the name "The Sermon on the Mount", although Stanford University historian Richard Joncas insists that the mosaic does not depict the scene as described in the Gospel of Matthew and has referred to it as "an indefinite biblical scene". In the Stanford University press release about the 1992 gift of three watercolor studies for the church's mosaics, Paoletti's design for the facade is described as "Christ Welcoming the Righteous into the Kingdom of God", based on Matthew 25:34. Paoletti created another unfinished watercolor depicting "The Last Judgment", as another option for the facade mosaic, but it was evidently rejected by Stanford.

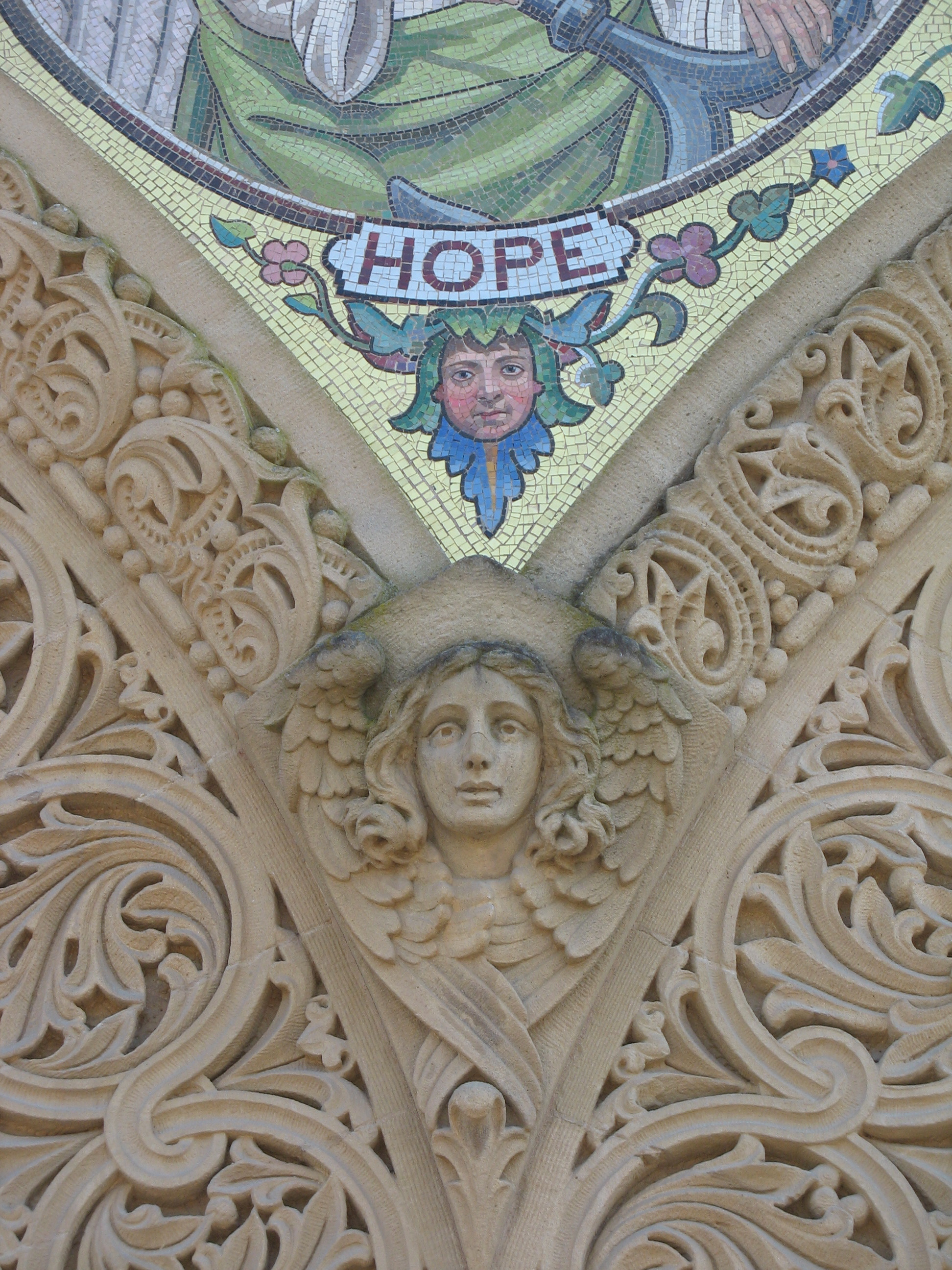
Detail of the foliate carvings around the doors

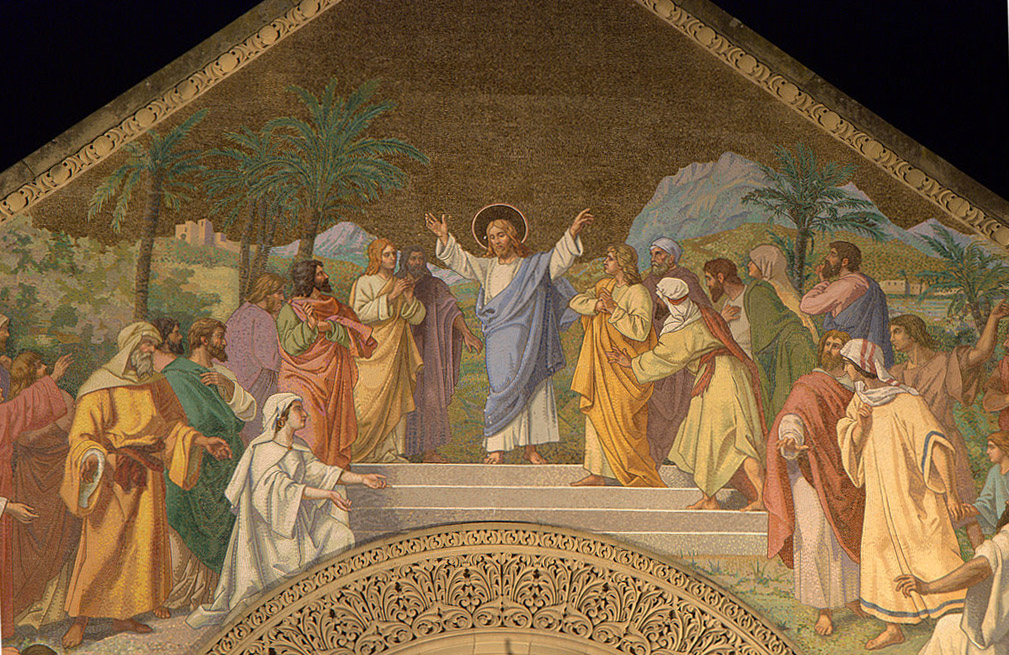
Detail of the exterior mosaic

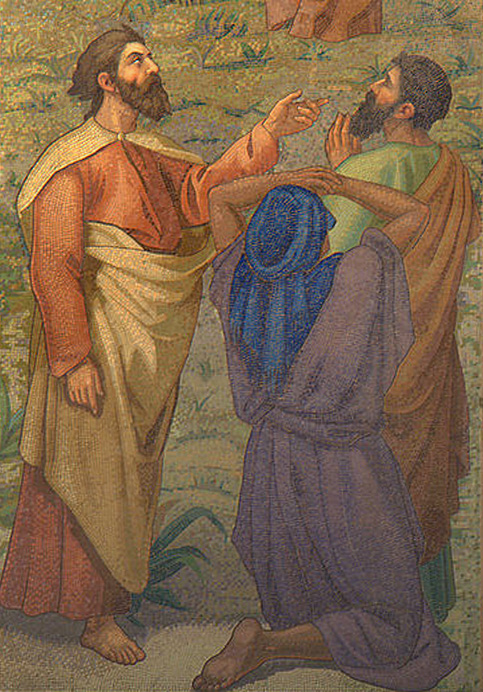
Detail of the facade mosaic, to the left of the windows

=== Interior ===
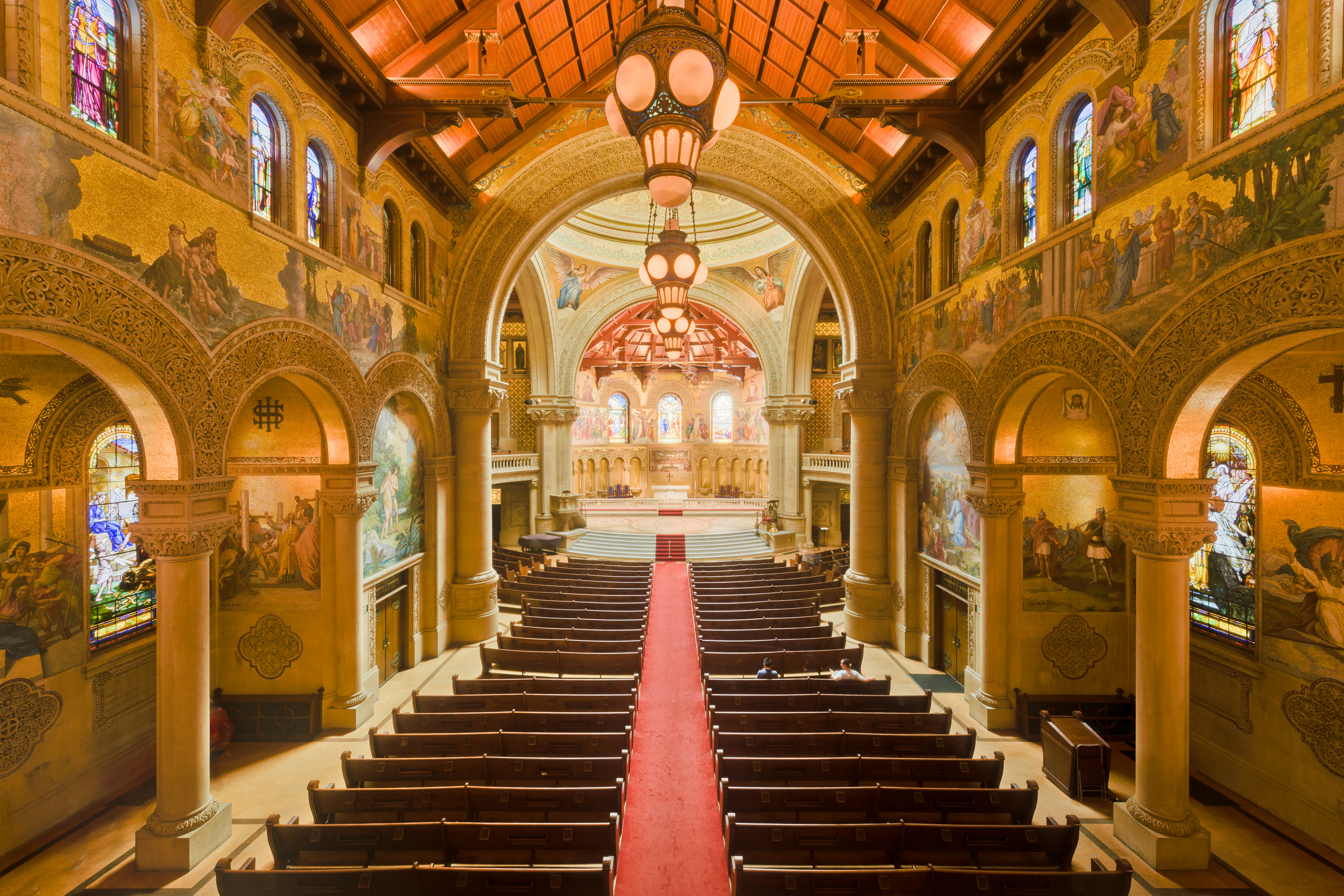
Interior view from the organ loft looking towards the chancel

Jane Stanford has been described as having a "Victorian aversion to blank space" and so created a church that is "a dimly lit cavern of glowing mosaic surfaces ... and vibrant, stained-glass windows". The church is richly decorated throughout, its architectural features carved with formalized foliate ornament, and the walls adorned with mosaics in the Byzantine manner. Even though the church was dedicated in 1903, interior decoration took another two years to complete, with the installation of the mosaics and the carving of the extensive quotations on the walls occurring simultaneously. There are 29 large carvings of quatrefoils that contain ancient religious symbols in the walls of church's west and east transepts. The stained-glass windows were crafted by J. and R. Lamb of New York. Its exposed-timber ceilings are modeled after Boston's Trinity Church.

The church is entered through three bronze doors adorned with angels, a recurring motif throughout the church. The doors open up into a narthex or vestibule decorated with mosaics on the walls, illuminated by the many colors of the stained glass windows, and stone carvings on the architectural details. There is a variety of styles and motifs reflecting the hands of different craftsmen. The mosaic that adorns the floor depicts the Lamb of God surrounded by the symbols of the four gospel writers: St. Matthew (the winged angel), St. Mark (the winged lion), St. Luke (the ox), and St. John (the eagle). Some of these symbols also appear in other areas of the church. A Celtic cross adorns the stained glass above the central wooden door that leads into the nave, and Latin epigraphs have been engraved above the two side doors. (Note: Domus Dei Aula Coeli ("The house of God, the forecourt of heaven") above the right door; Domus Dei Locus Orationis ("The house of God, the house of prayer") above the left door.)

Above the narthex is an organ gallery. The nave is arcaded and has a single aisle on each side with clerestory windows above. Its walls, from the floor to the top of the clerestory, are decorated with 15 murals made of mosaics on each side, and depicts scenes from the Old Testament. The exposed timber ceiling was inspired by Trinity Church and is constructed with tied hammer beams, which can be seen radiating in the chancel. The floor of the church slopes downward towards the crossing. The chancel and transepts are three semi-circular apses. They are separated from the broad central space by large semi-circular arches on stout columns with carved capitals. The transept apses each have a balcony with a concave balustrade.

Directly above the crossing is a dome supported on pendentives. Around the base of the dome are decorative gilt bands, the lower depicting a scrolling vine. Jane Stanford intended the dome's decoration to be of mosaic tiles showing a variety of symbols, but the church's builders thought it would make the dome too heavy, so the decorations were painted. On the spandrels of the pendentives are mosaics of four angels measuring 42 feet (13 m) from wing tip to wing tip, rising from clouds. The angels survived the 1906 earthquake, but the angel looking downward was severely damaged during the 1989 earthquake because an 8-foot section of its left wing fell 70 feet (21 m).

The chancel, according to Hall, contains "artistic work of a kind seldom seen anywhere". The raised tiled floor of the chancel curves outward into the body of the church, and is approached by seven marble steps. The sanctuary is raised further, and enclosed by a marble altar rail behind which is an altar carved from white Carrara marble by L.M. Avenali. The altar supports a "simple unadorned brass cross that reflects the colors of the mosaics surrounding it." The cross was made by William van Erp and was dedicated to the memory of Jane Stanford in 1948.

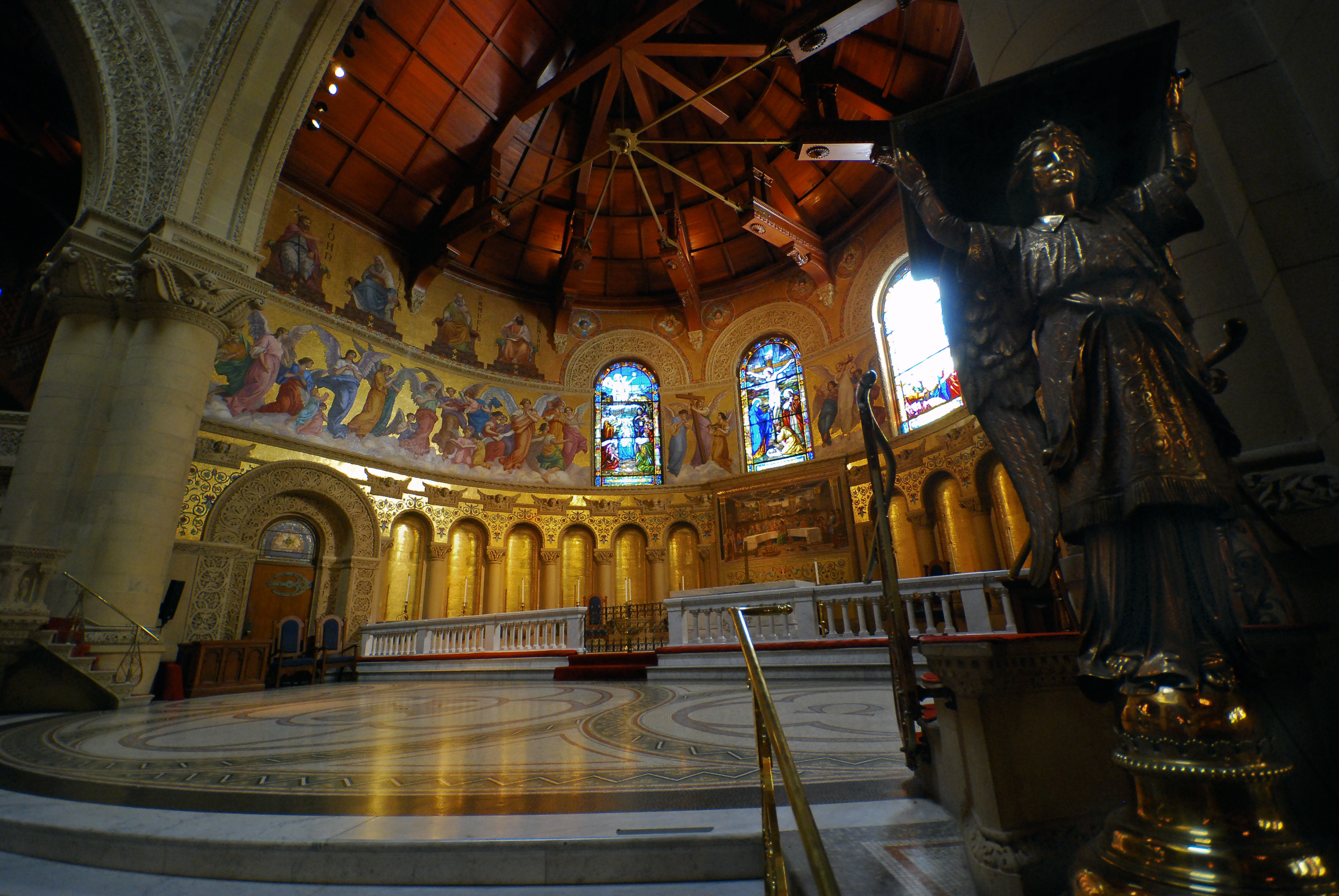
Wide view of the chancel in Stanford Memorial Church

Behind the altar is a mosaic reproduction of Rosselli's "Last Supper". Around the lower walls of the chancel are twelve niches decorated with golden mosaic tiles. They hold candles, but originally held statues of the twelve apostles, destroyed in 1906 and were never replaced. According to local legend, the cherubim carved in stone above the golden niches and in the pillars' capitals are illustrations of children living on campus at the time of the church's construction. To the west side of the chancel stands brass lectern in the form of a reading angel, which Jane Stanford brought from Europe and dedicated to her husband on the anniversary of his birth in 1902.

Three stained glass windows in the apse depict the nativity, crucifixion, and ascension of Christ. The mosaics between them show angels, those on the left carrying a cross, those on the right carrying a crown. On the longer sections of the chancel wall, on either side of the windows, are mosaics depicting a choir of angels. Above them is a tier of mosaics with representations of the prophets and kings of Israel. Other mosaics abound in the transepts, clerestory, and the choir loft at the northern end of the church. A series of mosaics in the upper transepts depict Old Testament figures on the east side and Christian saints on the west side. On Jane Stanford's direction, they alternate male and female.

The arches, balcony rails, and pillars throughout the church have relief carvings created by a team of 10 men who worked for two years from scaffolding. A large double pillar before the entrance of the west transept have inscriptions dedicated to members of the Stanford family. After the 1989 earthquake, a third of the west transept was converted into a small chapel. The altar and chairs in this chapel were designed by Bay Area artist Gail Fredell who decorated the chapel's altar by using Salvatti's original mosaics, which had been stored since the church's reconstruction following the 1906 earthquake.

==== Windows ====
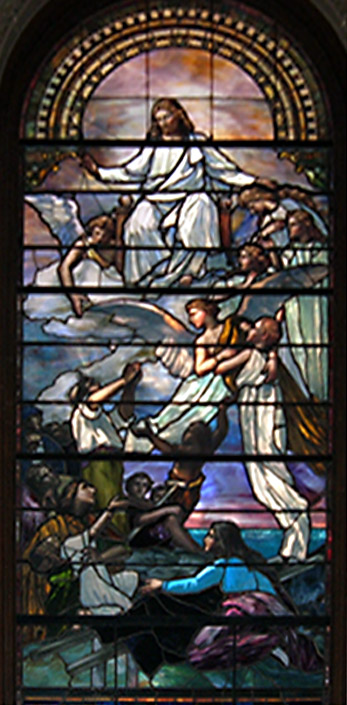
A window in the nave shows Christ welcoming a soul into Heaven, a reference to the death of Leland Stanford Jr.

According to architectural historian Willis L. Hall, the church's 20 large stained glass windows "are as much a feature of the church as the mosaics". The windows, designed by Frederick Stymetz Lamb (1862–1928) and fabricated by J&R Lamb Studios, his father's firm in New York City, took three years to complete, and eight months to install at Stanford. Jane Stanford hired Lamb because she felt he was more interested in "the ecclesiastical rather than commercial aspect of the work". The installation of the windows at Stanford Memorial Church was the largest commission awarded to an American stained glass artist at the time, and the project is "considered the finest example of Lamb's work". The window have a different appearance when viewed from the outside of the building because the reflected light highlights the textures of the glass panels, created by using many layers of different colored glass.

Stanford chose the life of Christ for the windows' theme, inspired by the religious paintings by European master painters such as Frederic Shields and Gustave Doré. The windows have a section at the bottom with the scriptural quotations their images depict; the larger windows also include their titles. Stanford's personal touch is shown in one of the nave windows, which is based on a cartoon by Paoletti and depicts Christ welcoming the soul of a child into Heaven before the eyes of its grieving mother, an allusion to the death of Leland Stanford Jr., the Stanfords' only child and the university's namesake, who died in 1884 of typhoid shortly before his 16th birthday.

Oberhausen, who has studied the source of the mosaics and windows, states that at least four stained glass windows were inspired by the paintings of Pre-Raphaelite artists that were enjoying a resurgence in popularity at the time. These windows are: "Christ in the Temple" in the east transept, based upon a painting by William Holman Hunt; "The Annunciation" in the east nave, inspired by a work by Frederic Shields; "The Nativity" in the chancel, based upon a painting by Edward Fellowes-Prynne; and "The Good Shepherd" in the west transept, inspired by a painting by Sibyl C. Parker, the only female artist represented in the artwork of the church. None of the windows of Stanford Memorial Church required replacement after the 1906 quake, except for "the famous rose window of the original structure" in the organ loft which was replaced by the current large, central arch window. This window, entitled "Lilies of the Field", is the only window in the church that cannot be viewed from the inside because it is blocked off by the central organ. There is a cross in the center of this window made of "faceted pieces of glass that are inset like gems", which sparkle when light strikes it.

The church's clerestory contains many smaller windows of individuals from the Bible or Christian history. The windows in the nave above the east arcade depict the following Old Testament figures: Abraham, Hagar and her child Ishmael, Moses, Pharaoh's Daughter, Joshua, and Deborah. The windows in the east transept depict David, Ruth, Solomon, The Queen of Sheba, Elijah, Esther, Isaiah, Judith, Daniel, and Hannah. In the nave above the west arcade feature saints and virtues: Stephen, Agnes, Peter, Priscilla, John, and Hope. In the west transept are Simeon, Anne, Matthew, Faith, Mark, Charity, Luke, Dorcas, Paul, and Martha. The clerestory above the east and west doors are two windows of angels. Unlike the other windows throughout the church, they do not receive natural light from outside and are artificially illuminated instead.

Stanford Memorial Church's stained glass windows, at the east side of the church

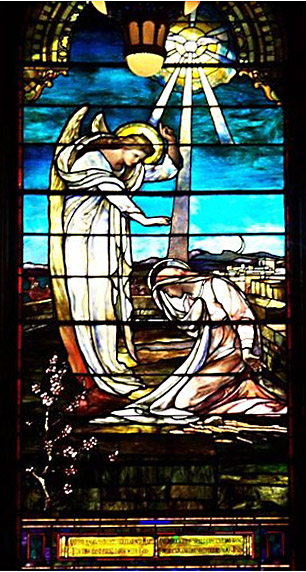
"The Annunciation"

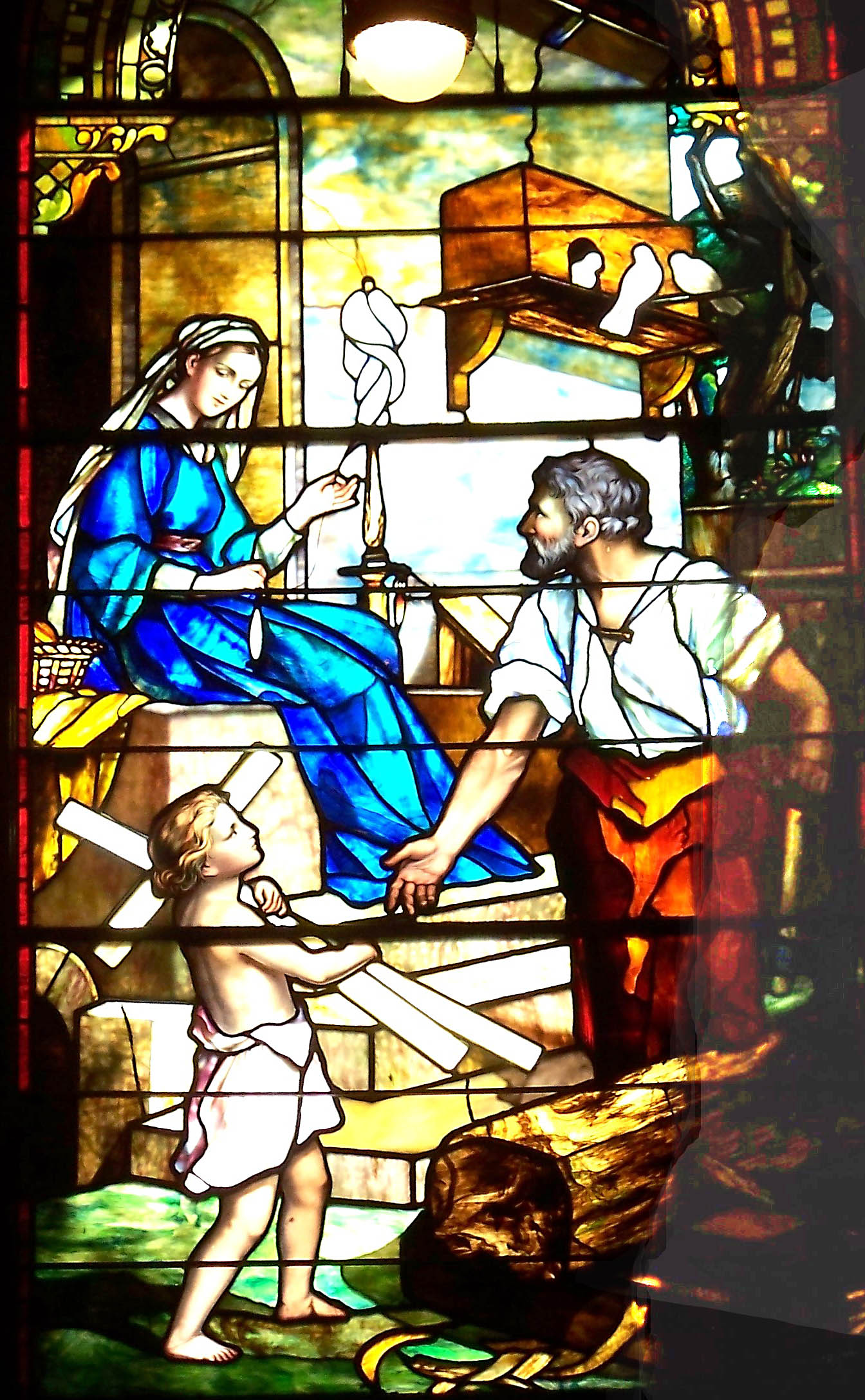
"The Home at Nazareth"

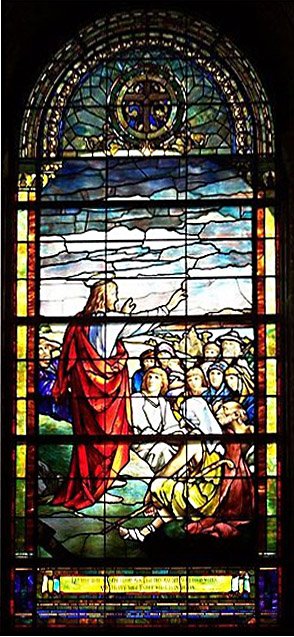
"The Sermon on the Mount"

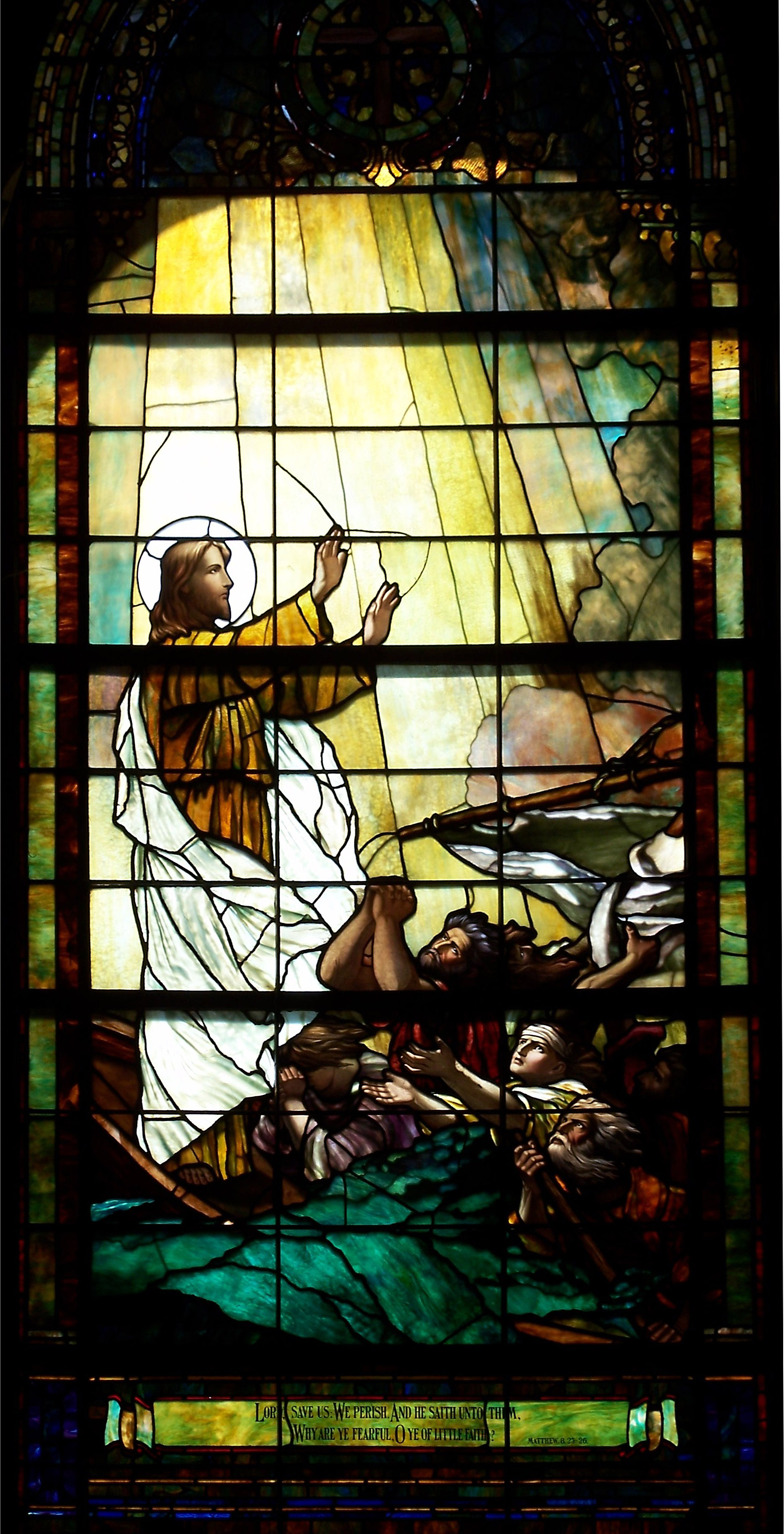
"Christ Calming the Tempest"

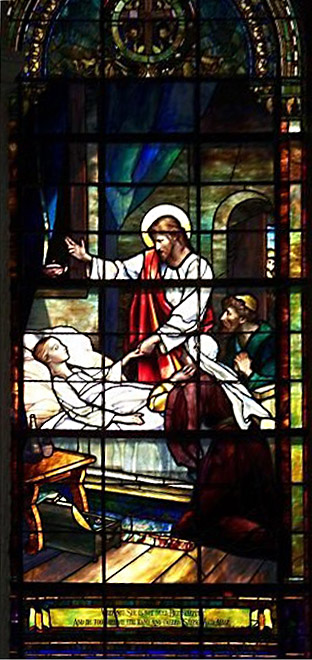
"The Raising of Jairus' Daughter"

East Nave
Title	Inspired by
"The Annunciation"	Frederic Shields
"The flight into Egypt"	Bernhard Plockhorst
"The Home at Nazareth"	Heinrich Hofmann

West Nave
Title	Inspired by
"The Dream of Pilate's Wife"	Doré
"The Angel at the Tomb" (Note: Lamb created "subtle shadows" in the angel's robe by using layers of colored glass and white glass. He also created a luminescent effect by setting the angel against a dark background.)	Axel Ender
"Lo, I Am with You Always"	designed by Antonio Paoletti

East transept (Note: The best time to view these windows is in the early morning.)
Title	Inspired by
"The Child Jesus in the Temple"	"The Finding of the Saviour in the Temple" by William Holman Hunt
"The Baptism of Christ"	Gustave Doré
"The Sermon on the Mount"	Hofmann
"Christ Calming the Tempest"	Anton Dietrich
"The Raising of Jairus' Daughter"	Hofmann

West Transept
Title	Inspired by
"The Miracle of the Loaves and Fishes"	"Pan y Peces" by Bartolomé Esteban Murillo
"Christ and the Adulteress"	Hofmann
"The Good Shepherd"	"The Door of the Fold" by Sibyl C. Parker
"Christ in the Home at Bethany"	Hofmann
"Christ in Gethsemane"	Hofmann

Chancel
Title	Inspired by
"The Nativity"	Edward Fellowes-Prynne
"The Crucifixion"	Ernst Deger
The Ascension	Johann Karl Loth ("Carlotto") (Note: Carlotto's painting was in turn probably inspired by Raphael's painting of the Transfiguration of Christ.)

==== Mosaics ====
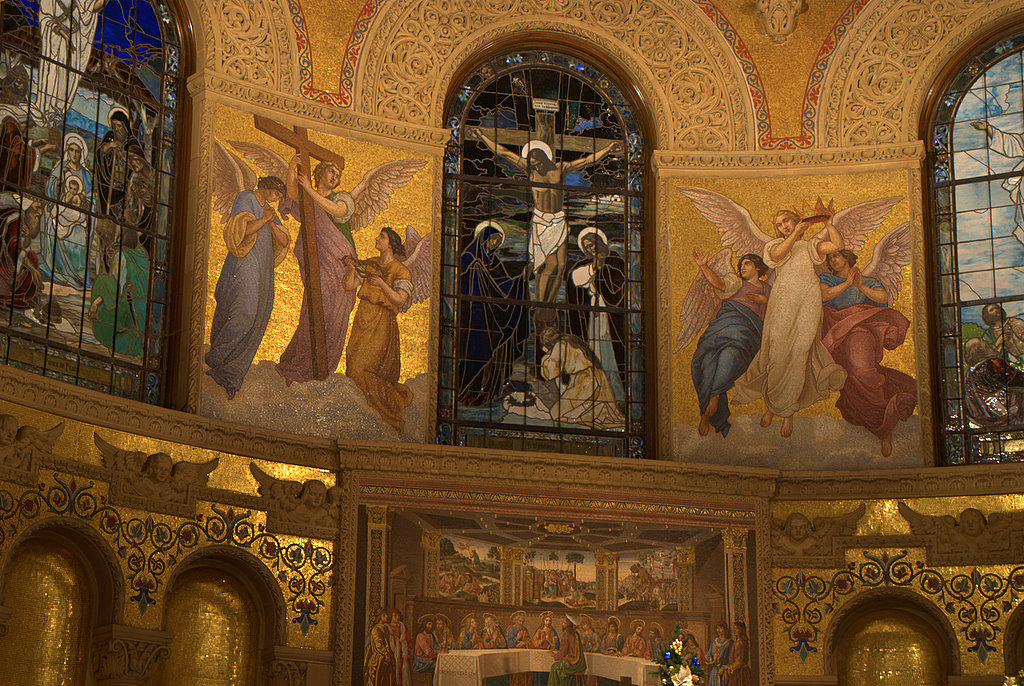
Part of the Seraph choir mosaics located on the chancel wall. The reredos contains a copy of Rosselli's "The Last Supper".

The mosaics that decorate Stanford Memorial Church, which Taylor considers "a perfect complement to Frederick Lamb's stained-glass windows", are "virtually everywhere" inside the church. According to Gregg, Jane Stanford came up with the idea, calling it "idiosyncratic by some architectural historians", of extensively decorating Memorial Church's interior and facade, similar in style to the mosaics in many of the churches she and her husband admired during their travels in Europe. One of the reasons she chose mosaics was because of the similar weather in Italy and Northern California, where the moderate climates and rainy seasons in both settings protect the images from erosion and clear the pollution that accumulates on many buildings in large cities. As Hall states, the "mosaics on the facade are always clear and brilliant." During the Stanfords' 1883 tour of Europe, they visited Byzantine churches in Constantinople and St Mark's Basilica in Venice. They met and befriended Maurizio Camerino, the manager of the Antonio Salviati studios, which had just completed restoring the mosaics at St Mark's.

Stanford began working with Camerino, who by that time had bought the Salviati studios, in 1899, and spent two months in Venice in the fall of 1900, selecting the watercolors created as the mosaics' patterns by Camerino's chief designer, Antonio Paoletti. (Note: In 1992, Camerino's family, in honor of the friendship between the Camerino and Stanford families, donated three watercolor studies of the Memorial Church mosaics, painted by Paoletti, to Stanford University. They were displayed in a back room at the headquarters of Salviati & Company in Venice before the donation, which took two years to procure. The watercolors, which measured 3 feet by 6 feet, included Paoletti's rendering of the church's exterior mosaic. University archivist Maggie Kimball called the paintings "important pieces of university history.") Camerino's firm worked exclusively on the Stanford mosaics for three years; the project, which included the mosaics created for the university museum, was the largest mosaic project in the U.S. at the time. Stanford worked closely with Paoletti, planning a combination of Old Testament and New Testament scenes that represented men and women equally.

The mosaic project began in 1900, took five years to complete, and cost US$97,000. (Note: This figure is the equivalent of almost US$3 million in 2017.) The "shimmering quality" of the mosaics, which resemble tapestry, were created by different tones of green and gold; the artists that installed them had over 20,000 shades of colors to choose from. Paoletti's watercolors were divided into two-foot-square sections, which were made into glass by other artists in Venice. The mosaics were then shipped in pieces by boat to New York and then by railroad to California, where they were placed on the church's walls. (Note: After the mosaics were destroyed in the 1906 earthquake, they were able to be recreated because the original designs had been stored in the Salviati & Company studios.) Artisan Lorenzo Zampato was given the task of supervising the in-studio fabrication and final installation at Stanford, which took 4 years to complete.

The mosaic adorning the church's chancel is a reproduction of Rosselli's fresco of the Last Supper from the Sistine Chapel in the Vatican. Camerino obtained permission from Pope Leo XIII to reproduce it at Stanford Memorial Church. Unlike other works, which were reproduced frequently, it was the only reproduction of Rosselli's fresco at the time. There are 12 mosaics in each transept balcony that are split into two sets of six, creating an arc of six mosaics, ten windows, and six mosaics. Most of the church's mosaics were made from 1/8-inch tiles; larger 3/4-inch tiles were used on the higher mosaics, and smaller 1/4-inch tiles were used in "The Last Supper" mosaic. (Note: List taken from Hall, pp. 31–33)

Title(s)	Location
"Christ Welcoming the Righteous into the Kingdom of God" (Note: Commonly known as "The Sermon on the Mount")	Outside facade
Love, Faith, Hope, and Charity mosaics	Below facade, between windows
Monogram medallions (Note: Forms the Greek letters alpha and omega and Christ's initials (Chi Rho).)	Vestibule
Two cherub groups (Note: Cherubs holding tablets with the inscriptions, Domus Dei Locus Orationis ("The House of God, the place of prayer") and Domus Dei Aula Coeli ("The House of God, the forecourt of heaven").)	In the frieze over the doors from the vestibule to the nave
"Our Lord on His Throne Surrounded by the Four Evangelists, Apostles, Kings and Friends"	Under the organ loft and over the doors
"The Prayer of Hannah", "Ahasuerus Selects Esther to be his Queen", "The Judgement of Solomon", "Saul Casts His Spear at David", "God's Promise to Solomon when Building the Temple"	East Nave, under the arches of the east wall
"The Garden of Eden" (Note: This mosaic measures 12 feet (3.7 m) by 15 feet (4.6 m).)	East door, near the pilaster
"God Separating Light from Darkness", "The First Family", "The Deluge", "The Tower of Babel", "Moses Saved From the Water"	East clerestory over the arches
"Noah is Ordered to Build the Ark", "Abraham is Informed He Will Have a Son", "Abraham Sees the Promised Land", "Angel Gabriel Announces to Zacharias the Conception of John the Baptist", "Daniel's Prophecy"	East clerestory between the windows
"Last Supper", "Seraph Choir" (Note: Also called "The Glory of the Angels".)	The wall of the chancel
"John the Baptist", "Ezekiel", "Samuel", "Jeremiah"	Above the east apse
"David", "Elijah", "Moses", "Isaiah"	Above the west apse
The four archangels emerging from clouds. (Note: The ceiling of the dome is decorated in mosaic, a notable feature being a frieze containing a large number of medallions.)	Over the four pilasters supporting the dome
Spandrels decorated in mosaic	Dome ceiling
Child's face (Note: This is the hidden mosaic in the church, and one of two mosaics to survive the 1906 earthquake.)	Triangular area in front of dome
"Rebekah and Isaac", "Rachel Sees Jacob Approaching", "Moses is Ordered to take Israel out of Egypt", "Moses Sees the Promised Land", "Joshua finds a Captain for His Hosts"	Starting at the church entrance, the west wall of the nave, between the windows
"Old Testament Prophecies Concerning the Coming of Christ"	Over the west door, near the pilaster
"Moses Receiving the Tablets of the Law", "Joshua Successor of Moses", "David Anointed for the First Time", "Meeting of David and Abigail", "David Singing His Psalms"	West clerestory, over the arches
"Joseph Sold by His Brothers", "Jacob Going to Canaan", "Isaac Blessing Jacob", "Dream of Jacob", "Abraham Restrained From offering up Isaac"	West clerestory between windows
"Noah", "Noah's Wife", "Isaac", "Rebecca", "Jacob", "Rachel", "Tobias", "Sarah (Tobias's wife)", "Nathan", "Deborah", "Aaron", "Naomi" (Note: The lunettes over the doors are decorated with cherub singers and the remainder of the wall has tapestry mosaic work in a variety of colors.)	East Transept Gallery wall
"St. Helena", "St. James", St. Margaret", "St. Andrew", "St. Philemon", "St. Thaddeus", "St. Elizabeth", "St. Bartholomew", "St. Mary Magdalene", "St. Barnabas", "St. Gertrude", "St. Philip" (Note: The lunettes of the doorways and the walls are decorated with tapestry mosaic work.)	West Transept Gallery wall

==== Organs ====
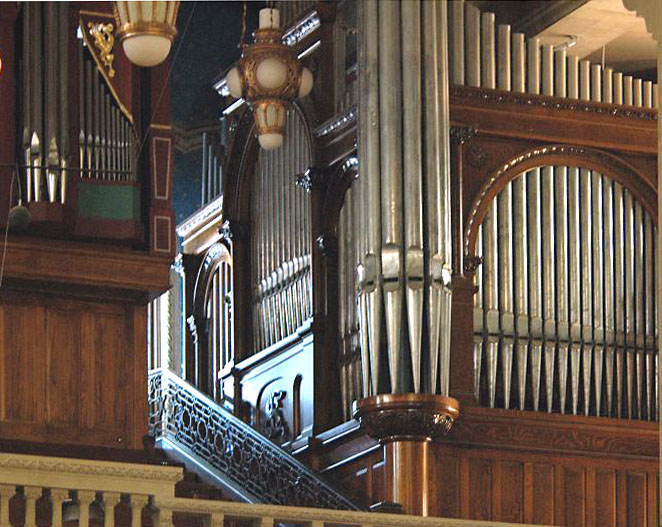
The wooden cases and metal pipes of the two largest organs, the Murray Harris and the Fisk-Nanney, rising from the organ loft

Stanford Memorial Church houses five organs, a "situation only a few places in the nation can boast". (Note: According to Charles Hendrickson, president of the Associated Pipe Organ Builders of America, "Any church with more than two organs gets your attention".) The presence of high-quality organs makes Stanford an ideal location for accomplished musicians, and the sanctuary one of California's best settings for instrumental and choral performance. The church's organist is Robert Huw Morgan.

Stanford Memorial Church's first organ, the 1901 Murray Harris, named for its builder Murray M. Harris, sits in the upstairs gallery and is still in use. Damaged in the 1906 earthquake, the organ was rebuilt in 1925, enlarged in 1933, and thoroughly restored in 1996. It features three manuals (keyboards for the hands), 57 stops, and over 3,700 pipes. The Murray Harris plays music from the Romantic period; (Note: Every organ specializes in a different period or style of music; the organs in Memorial Church create music from the 14th century up to contemporary times.) its sound has been described as "romantic [and] undulating" and "like a low-decibel airplane engine revving up" Morgan compares the Murray Harris to both a Rolls-Royce and a Bentley.

The Fisk-Nanney organ, which many consider one of the best organs in the world, was built in 1985 and is also housed in the church's upstairs gallery. It is named after its builder, Charles Brenton Fisk, and for Herbert Nanney, who was the church's organist for 39 years. Although it was commissioned in 1973, its completion was delayed for many years, due to logistical, financial, and construction issues. The organ's case is made of poplar wood and its almost 4,500 pipes are made of varying sizes of lead and tin. Its keyboards, which Morgan calls the "flight deck," are made with grenadilla, with rosewood making up its natural and sharps, and are capped with bone. The organ's keyboards are black on white, instead of the modern white on black. The stop controls create "a huge array of sounds".

Robert Huw Morgan plays Bach's Fantasia and Fugue in G minor on the church's Fisk-Nanney.

The Fisk-Nanney is a four-manual Baroque-type organ with 73 ranks. It uses a "combination of elements from historic East German, North German, and French organs plus dual temperaments", and is "the first instrument in the history of organ building that is capable of reproducing nearly all organ music written from the 16th through the 18th centuries". The organ, which "has remarkable complexity", features both French- and German-style reeds and principal choruses. It is equipped with a Brustpositiv division in meantone temperament. A lever allows the remaining divisions to alternate between well temperament and meantone temperament, a feature made possible by the inclusion of five extra pipes (two for each sharp key) per octave.

Morgan describes the organ's sound as "delicious" and "visceral", ringing with "'incredible clarity' and 'dark color'", and compares it to driving a Maserati. He insists that the best place to listen to the Fisk-Nanny is not upstairs in the gallery where it sits, but in the church, "about halfway down the nave". In 2005 Morgan performed the complete organ works of Dieterich Buxtehude during a series of recitals, eight hours in all, to celebrate the organ's 20th anniversary. During the 2009–2010 school year, Morgan commemorated the 25th anniversary of the Fisk-Nanney organ and his 10th year at Stanford in a concert series of the complete organ works of Johann Sebastian Bach, which took 18 hours to complete.

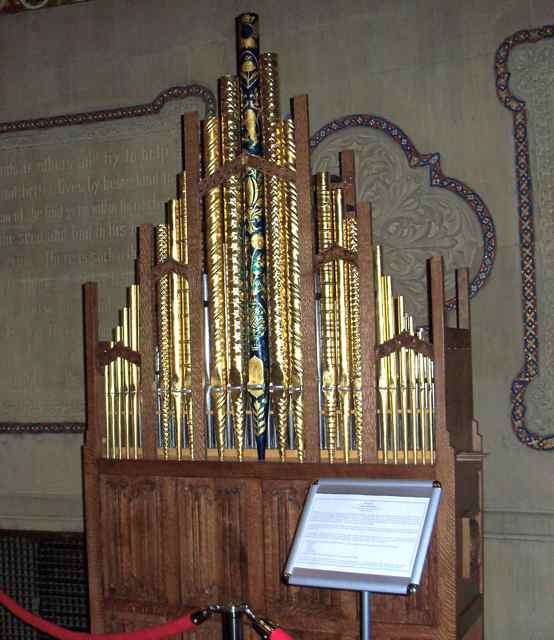
The Hupalo and Repasky five-rank Tudor-style organ shown against the walls of the side chapel

Memorial Church's third organ, the Katherine Potter-Brinegar organ, was built in 1995 and was named for the spouse of Stanford alumni Claude S. Brinegar. It "further enhances" the diversity of the organs in Stanford Memorial Church, and was inspired by a famous chamber organ designed by German organ maker Esias Compenius in 1610. It is self-contained, with its blower and bellows encased in its walnut case, and has hidden, retractable wheels that allow it to moved anywhere in the church. It is a single-manual organ; most of its pipework is made of different types of wood, and has 8 speaking stops, 3 of which are made of reed pipes. Its sound has been described as "relaxed and refined to the listener".

The continuo organ built by Martin Pasi of Roy, Washington was acquired in June 2001. It contains three stops. The case and most of its pipes are made of walnut, and its keys are made of ebony and English boxwood.

In 2010 the church received on long-term loan a five-rank Tudor-style organ built by Hupalo & Repasky Pipe Organs. It is a recreation based upon the work of English organ builders and restorers Martin Goetze and Dominic Gwynn and of the discovery in 1995 of the upper boards, grid, and table of a rare English organ, one of only three out of the five organs of the type in existence. It is a "small but tonally versatile" organ typical of the Tudor era of the 16th century.

The Tudor organ's 200 pipes are made from metals with high tin content, and its façade pipes have been gilded and embossed. Its case, which was inspired by organ cases in churches in Wales and Stanford-on-Avon, is made of stained white oak, with hand-carved panels of linen fold and Tudor rose (inspired by the Tudor rose on Shrewsbury Tower at St. John's College in Cambridge) carvings. The Tudor's keys are made of European pear wood; its sharps are made of ebony. It has two large feeder bellows that supply the organ's wind. The organ's sound is "surprisingly full and has a singing bell-like quality".

== Services and facilities ==
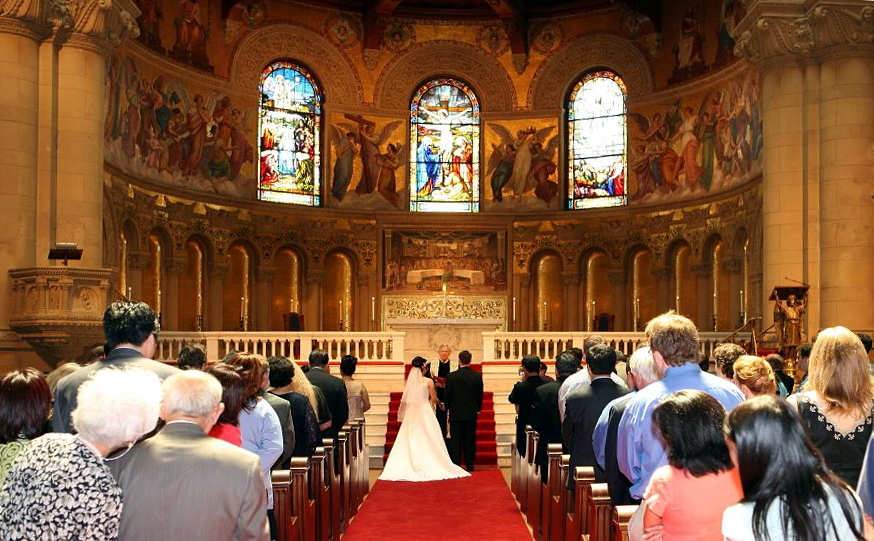
As of 1995, there had been over 7,000 weddings at Stanford Memorial Church.

Although the Stanfords were religious and viewed "spiritual and moral values as essential to a young person's education and future citizenship", they were not formally committed to any Christian denomination. As a result, Jane Stanford decreed, from the beginning of Stanford Memorial Church's history, that the church be non-denominational. She believed that adopting this philosophy would "serve the broadest spiritual needs of the university community". The church's first chaplain, Charles Gardner, declared on the day of its dedication that the church's goal was to serve the spiritual needs of the university in a non-sectarian way. The Stanfords' goal was that moral instruction would occur at the church, as demonstrated in the inscriptions carved into its walls, which was influenced by the late 19th-century liberal Protestantism they embraced. As former Stanford chaplain Robert C. Gregg states, "The Stanfords sought to protect free intellectual inquiry—in classroom, laboratory, and church—from any interference prompted by the caution or dogmatism of religious authorities".

Stanford Memorial Church was the earliest and has been "among the most prominent" non-denominational churches on the West Coast of the United States. Multi-faith services are held at Stanford Memorial Church, in addition to denominational and non-denominational Christian services. As many as 150 weddings or renewal ceremonies take place in the church each year, for current and former students and their children or grandchildren, for Stanford faculty and staff members, and for others connected to the university. (Note: The first wedding, of 1902 Stanford graduates William A. and Ethel Rhodes Holt, took place at Memorial Church in February 1903.) Memorial services, conducted by Stanford's dean and other chaplain officials, for students, alumni, faculty, and staff are also conducted at the church.

Members of the university community use Memorial Church for "quiet, for reflection, and for private devotions". Catholic masses are held in the church several times a week.

== See also ==
- Arlis Perry

== Bibliography ==
- Gregg, Robert C., Karen Bartholowmew, & Lesley Bone (1995). Stanford Memorial Church: Glory of Angels. Stanford, Calif.: Stanford Alumni Association. ISBN 0-916318-54-0
- Hall, Willis Lincoln (1917). Stanford Memorial Church: The Mosaics, the Windows, the Inscriptions. Palo Alto, Calif.: Times Publishing Co.
- Harvey, Van (Spring/Summer 1998). "Religious Studies at Stanford: An Historical Sketch". In Sandstone & Tile, Vol. 22, Nos. 2 and 3, pp. 3–10.
- Joncas, Richard, David J. Neuman, and Paul V. Turner (2006). The Campus Guide: Stanford University. New York: Princeton Architectural Press. ISBN 1-56898-538-X
  - Turner, Paul V., "The Stanford Campus: Its Place in History", pp. 2–7.
  - Joncas, Richard, "Part 1: The Stanford Farm and Other Early Buildings", pp. 14–19.
  - Joncas, Richard, "Part 2: The Original Campus, 1886–1906", pp. 20–53.
- Oberhausen, Judy (Spring 2005). "Stanford Memorial Church: A Late Victorian Jewel". In The Pre-Raphaelite Society Newsletter of the United States, No. 10, pp. 3–4.
