= Fugue in G minor, BWV 578 =

Organ composition by Johann Sebastian Bach

Bram Brandemann plays BWV 578 on the Hinsz organ at the Buitenkerk Kampen

Woodwind rendition by the United States Air Force Band, transposed to C minor

Fugue in G minor, BWV 578, (popularly known as the Little Fugue), is a piece of organ music written by Johann Sebastian Bach during his years at Arnstadt (1703–1707). It is one of Bach's best known fugues and has been arranged for other voices, including an orchestral version by Leopold Stokowski.

Early editors of Bach's work attached the title of "Little Fugue" to distinguish it from the later Great Fantasia and Fugue in G minor, BWV 542, which is longer in duration and more challenging to play.

== Score ==
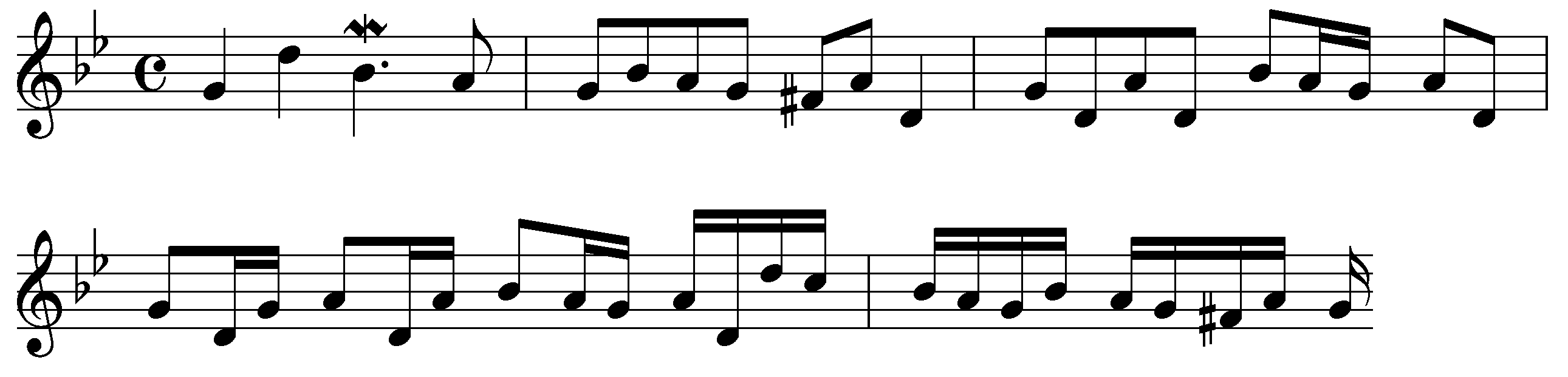
Theme

The fugue's four-and-a-half measure subject in G minor is one of Bach's most recognizable tunes. The fugue is in four voices. During the episodes, Bach uses one of Arcangelo Corelli's most famous techniques: imitation between two voices on an eighth note upbeat figure that first leaps up a fourth and then falls back down one step at a time.

== In other music ==
Swedish heavy metal band Sabaton uses the beginning of the piece in the song "The Red Baron" from their album The Great War. The piece is transposed to C minor, and the first voice is lowered an octave relative to the second voice. The Carolina Crown Drum and Bugle Corps also included sections of the piece in the opener of their 2017 program "It Is". Dennis DeYoung of the American progressive rock band Styx in 1973 transposed the essential melody into the key of D minor (hence the use of quotation marks around "G minor" in the title) as an introduction to the following song on the album (Father) which is in D major.
