= Robert Huw Morgan =

American organist and choral conductor

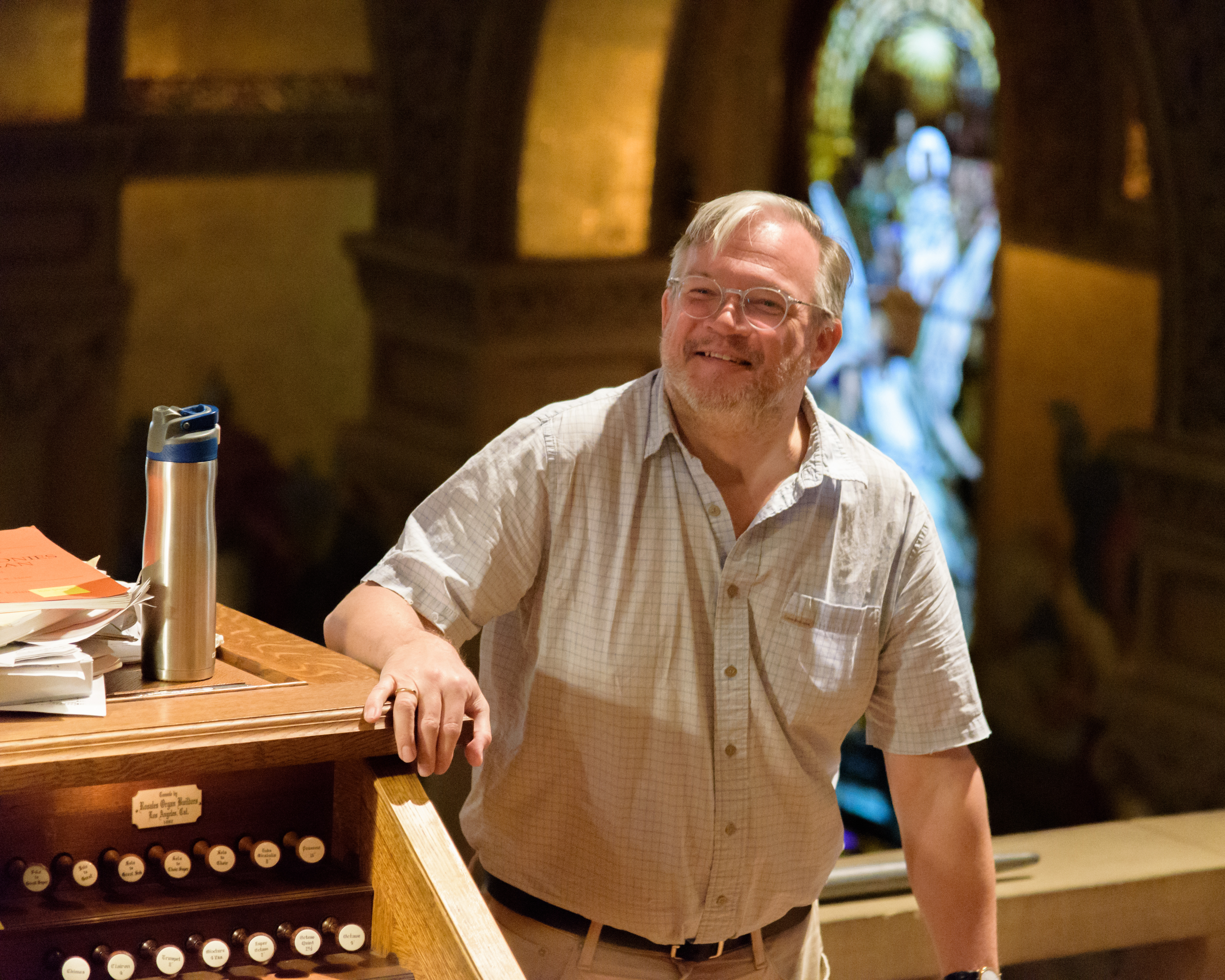
Robert Huw Morgan giving a talk in Stanford Memorial Church

Robert Huw Morgan plays Bach's Fantasia and Fugue in G minor on the Fisk-Nanney organ at Stanford Memorial Church.

Robert Huw Morgan (born 1967) is a Welsh-born organist and choral conductor. He serves as the University Organist at Stanford University's Memorial Church.

== Biography ==
A native of Newport, Wales, Morgan received his bachelor's and master's degrees from the University of Cambridge, where he was an organ scholar at St. John's College under George Guest. He earned doctorates in organ performance and choral conducting from the University of Washington School of Music, studying with Carole Terry and Peter Erős.

As a conductor, he has led performances of several operas (Falstaff, Hansel & Gretel and Die Fledermaus, among others), as well as large-scale choral works including Bach's St. John Passion and Mass in B minor, Mozart's Requiem and Mass in C minor, and the Vespers of Rachmaninoff and Monteverdi. He has performed the complete organ works of J.S. Bach and Dieterich Buxtehude.

In addition to his duties at the Memorial Church, he holds the positions of Lecturer in Organ and Choral Studies and Director of the Stanford University Singers. He is a fellow of the Royal College of Organists.
