= Robert Hamerton-Kelly =

South African-American theologian (1938–2013)

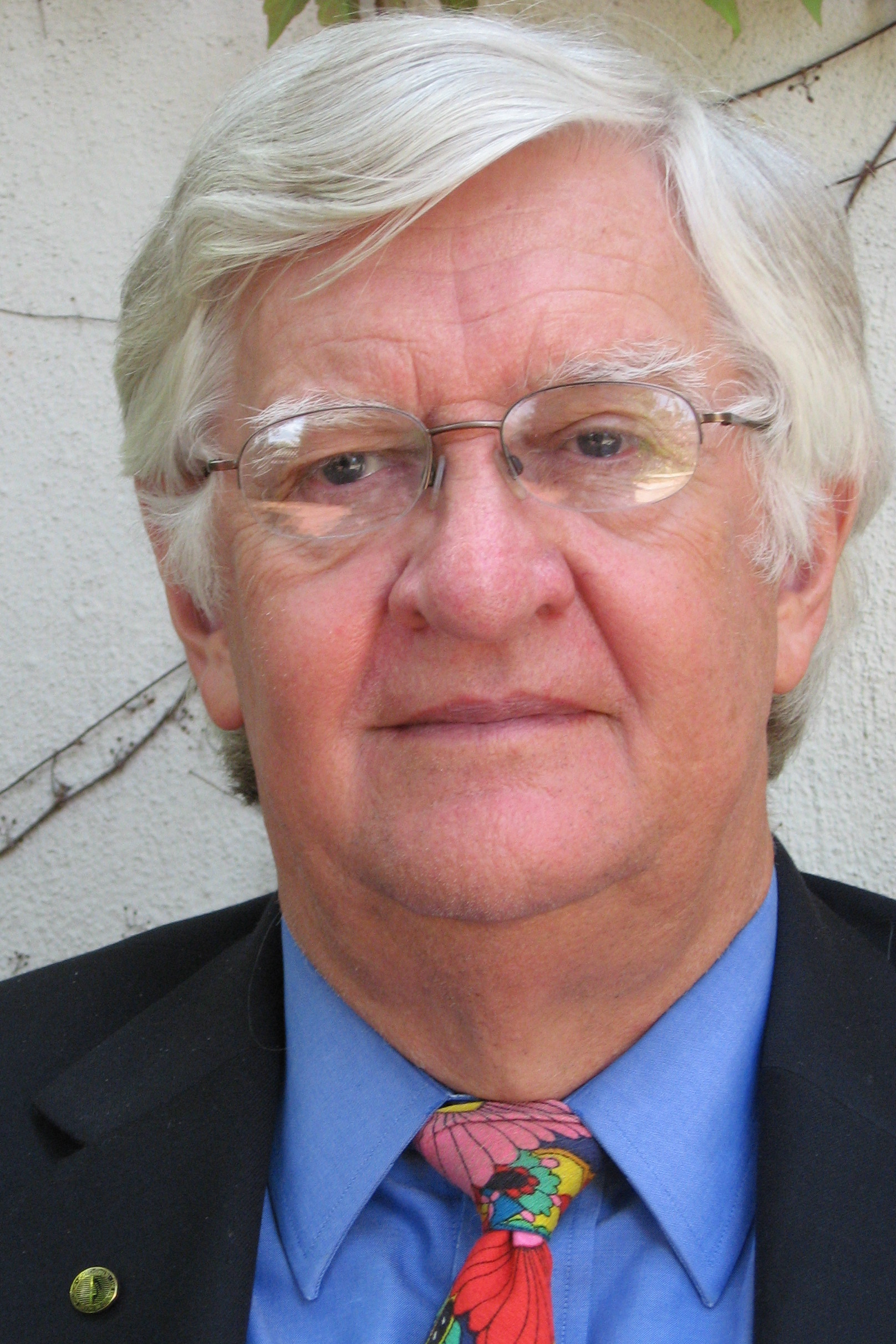
- Born: December 26, 1938; Cape Town, South Africa
- Died: July 7, 2013 (aged 74); Portland, Oregon
- Occupations: Minister, University Professor
- Years active: Late 20th and Early 21st Centuries
- Notable work: Sacred Violence: Paul's Hermeneutic of the Cross; The Gospel and the Sacred: Poetics of Violence in Mark; Violent Origins (Editor)
- Spouse: Rosemary
- Theological work
- Tradition or movement: United Methodist
- Main interests: Mimetic theory

Robert Gerald Hamerton-Kelly (December 26, 1938 – July 7, 2013) was a Christian theologian, ordained United Methodist pastor, ethics scholar, and author and editor of several books on religion and violence. He served as Dean of the Chapel at Stanford Memorial Church at Stanford University for 14 years and was on the faculty of the university for more than 30 years. A leading advocate of the work of René Girard's theory of mimetic desire, Hamerton-Kelly co-founded several organizations dedicated to the study of the theory and edited several important texts about it.

== Education and early career ==
Hamerton-Kelly was born in Cape Town, South Africa. He attended the University of Cape Town and Rhodes University, from which he received a bachelor's degree in 1958. He received a second bachelor's and a master's in theology from the University of Cambridge in 1965. A member of Gonville and Caius College, Hamerton-Kelly ran cross country with the Cambridge University Hare and Hounds. He also met his wife, Rosemary, at Cambridge, with whom he had three children.

After emigrating to the United States, Hamerton-Kelly studied at the Union Theological Seminary in the City of New York under W. D. Davies, earning a Th.D. in 1965. From 1966 to 1970, he was an assistant professor of religion at Scripps College in Claremont, California. He was ordained as a minister in the United Methodist Church in 1967. From 1970 to 1972, he was associate professor of the New Testament at McCormick Theological Seminary in Chicago.

== Stanford University ==
In 1973, Hamerton-Kelly was hired as Dean of the Chapel at Stanford University. In that capacity, he also was minister of Stanford Memorial Church, and a Consulting Professor of Religious Studies and Classics, where he taught New Testament Greek to graduate and undergraduate students. He also taught Western Civilization to undergraduates.

Hamerton-Kelly's work was not limited to pastoral study; his interest in religious violence led him to the work of fellow Stanford professor René Girard, where he became an advocate for Girard's theory of mimetic desire, in which imitation of others is the source of all human conflict, with conflict resolved through the use of a scapegoat and the introduction of religion. Hamerton-Kelly's Christian perspective in the subject led him to write several books which interpret New Testament writings from a Girardian perspective: these include Sacred Violence: Paul's Hermeneutic of the Cross, published in 1992; and The Gospel and the Sacred: Poetics of Violence in Mark, published in 1994.

He was a co-founder of the Colloquium on Violence and Religion, which works to further research and discuss the themes of Girard's work. Another of Hamerton-Kelly's key works was editing 1987's Violent Origins: Walter Burkett, René Girard, and Jonathan Z. Smith on Ritual Killing and Cultural Formation, a collection of essays from early meetings of the colloquium by Girard, Jonathan Z. Smith, Walter Burkert, Burton L. Mack, and Renato Rosaldo, among others.

In 1986, Hamerton-Kelly resigned from Memorial Church and became a Senior Research Scholar at the Center for International Security and Arms Control (now the Center for International Security and Cooperation). In this capacity, he focused on the ethical issues raised by nuclear weapons and other aspects of military intervention. Hamerton-Kelly was particularly interested in ethnic conflict in Central Europe, in particular the role of religion in these conflicts. He traveled extensively in Central Europe during the early 1990s, shortly after the Revolutions of 1989 had created unprecedented democratization of the region, but which also exposed ethnic friction.

== After Stanford ==
In 1996, Hamerton-Kelly became pastor at the Woodside Village Church in Woodside, California, remaining there until 2004 and delivering more than 400 sermons. He started a speaker series in Woodside that featured several former Stanford colleagues, including Condoleezza Rice and former United States Secretary of Defense William Perry. After leaving Woodside, Hamerton-Kelly continued to deliver several sermons a month to a smaller congregation based in Palo Alto, California.

In 2005, through a connection with former student Peter Thiel, Hamerton-Kelly and Thiel founded Imitatio, an organization dedicated to promoting research in Girard's mimetic theory and disseminating awareness of it. Hamerton-Kelly served as the organization's first president from 2007 to 2010, when he retired to become Chairman Emeritus. He moved to Portland, Oregon in 2010. He died in 2013 after a stroke and short illness.

== Bibliography ==
=== Works written ===
- Pre-Existence, Wisdom, and The Son of Man: A Study of the Idea of Pre-Existence in the New Testament. Cambridge: Cambridge University Press. 1973. ISBN 978-0-521-61600-3.
- God the Father: Theology and Patriarchy in the Teaching of Jesus. Philadelphia: Augsburg Fortress Publishers. 1979. ISBN 978-0-8006-1528-4.
- Sprung Time, Seasons of the Christian Year. Nashville: Upper Room. 1980. ISBN 978-0-8358-0397-7.
- The Divine Passion: Reflections on the Prophets. Nashville: Upper Room. 1988. ISBN 978-0-8358-0580-3.
- Sacred Violence: Paul's Hermeneutic of the Cross. Fortress Press. 1992. ISBN 978-0-8006-2529-0.
- The Gospel and the Sacred: Poetics of Violence in Mark. Fortress Press. 1994. ISBN 978-0-8006-2669-3.

=== Works edited ===
- Robert Hamerton-Kelly and R. B. Palmer, ed. (1971). Philomathes: Essays in the Humanities in Memory of Philip Merlan. The Hague: Marthinus Niejhoff. ISBN 978-9-0247-5013-9.
- René Girard; Walter Burkert; Burton Mack; Renato Rosaldo; Jonathan Z. Smith (1987). Robert Hamerton-Kelly (ed.). Violent Origins: Ritual Killing and Cultural Formation. Stanford University Press. ISBN 978-0-8047-1518-8.
- Robert Hamerton-Kelly, ed. (2007). Politics and Apocalypse. Michigan State University Press. ISBN 978-0-87013-811-9.
