= Stanford Clock Tower =

Clock tower at Stanford University

Coordinates: 37.425950°N 122.168858°W

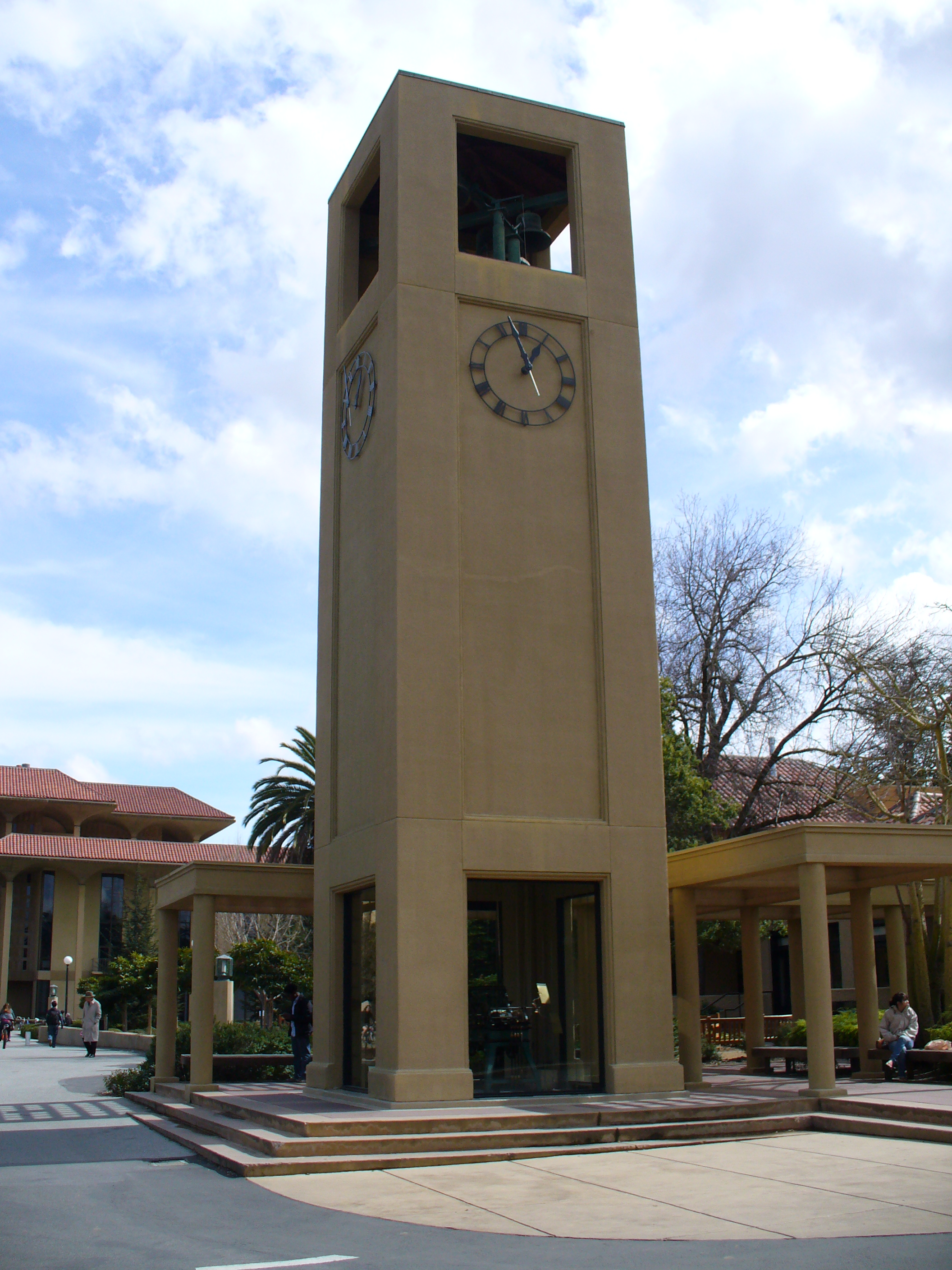
Clock Tower

The Stanford Clock Tower with its attached, colonnaded pergola is located at the so-called “Circle of Death” [an area known for bicycle accidents] at the corner of Escondido and Lasuen Malls on the campus of Stanford University. It was built in 1983 by a donation from trustee William Kimball.

It holds the mechanical clock, built in 1901 by the Seth Thomas Clock Company, which was originally housed in Stanford Memorial Church’s large belfry. When the belfry collapsed in the 1906 earthquake, the university preserved the chimes in temporary structures near the church, where they continued to chime the hours. (During the 1950s and 1960s the chimes were heard to strike thirteen times at noon, possibly the result of a student prank.) In 1983 the clock and chimes were rehoused in the current clock tower.

The clock mechanism still needs to be hand-cranked twice a week. In 1997, a new temperature-compensating pendulum designed by engineering students was installed to eliminate errors in time-keeping caused by temperature changes.

On May 10, 1983, when then-Stanford president Donald Kennedy unveiled the new clock tower, he burst out laughing: the clock's west face had been covered with Mickey Mouse's face and hands by an unknown prankster.
