= McKinsey (surname) =

Origin
- Meaning: Son of Coinneach
- Region of origin: Scotland

Other names
- Variant forms: Mackenzie (surname), Mackenzie (given name)

McKinsey is a variant of the Scottish surname McKenzie which, in turn, means 'son of Coinneach' (son of Kenneth). Notable people with the surname include:

- Beverlee McKinsey (1935–2008), American actor
- Daniel McKinsey, American physicist
- Dennis McKinsey (1940–2009), American writer
- James O. McKinsey (1889–1937), American business consultant
- J.C.C. McKinsey (1908–1953), American mathematician
- Jonathan McKinsey (1985 or 1986–2026), American games engineer
- Patricia McKinsey Crittenden (born 1945), developmental psychologist
- Scott McKinsey (born 1959), American television director

== See also ==
- Kinsey (disambiguation)
- Kinsey (surname)
- McKinsey (disambiguation)
