= Kimsen =

Family name

Kimsen is an Estonian surname. Notable people with the surname include:

- Kadri Kimsen (born 1976), Estonian footballer
- Kaire Kimsen (born 1978), Estonian footballer, sister of Kadri

== See also ==
- Kimsey
