= Kinsey =

Kinsey may refer to:

- Kinsey (surname)
- Alfred Kinsey
  - the Kinsey Reports, a pair of books on sexuality by Alfred Kinsey.
  - the Kinsey scale of sexual orientation, invented by Alfred Kinsey, or person's orientation as measured on that scale, as in "Kinsey 6"
  - the Kinsey Institute for Research in Sex, Gender and Reproduction, founded by Alfred Kinsey
  - Kinsey (documentary), a 2005 film aired on the PBS series American Experience
  - Kinsey (film), a 2004 biographical film about Alfred Kinsey, written and directed by Bill Condon
- Kinsey Millhone, the heroine in Sue Grafton's "alphabet mysteries" of books
- Kinsey (TV series), a former British TV programme
- Kinsey, Alabama, a town in the United States
- Kinsey, Indiana, an unincorporated community in the United States
- Kinsey, Montana, an unincorporated community in the United States
- Kinsey, Ohio, an unincorporated community in the United States
- The Kinsey Sicks, a comic a cappella quartet

== See also ==
- Kinsley (disambiguation)
- McKinsey (disambiguation)
