= John Brombaugh =

American pipe organ builder

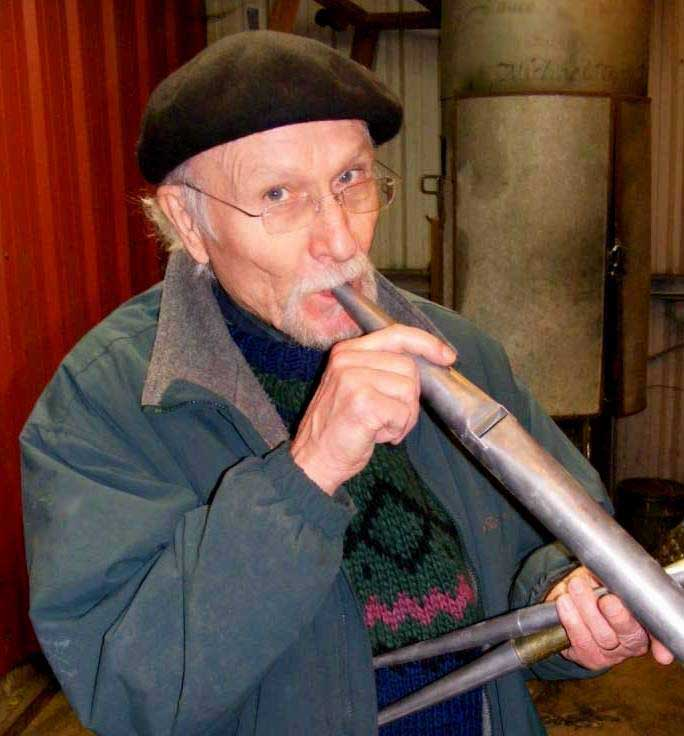
- Brombaugh in 2011
- Born: John Burlin Brombaugh; March 1, 1937 (age 89); Dayton, Ohio, U.S.
- Education: University of Cincinnati
- Occupation: Pipe organ builder

John Burlin Brombaugh (born March 1, 1937) is an American pipe organ builder known for his historically oriented tracker action pipe organs.

== Personal life and early training ==
Born in Dayton, Ohio, Brombaugh (related to the Brumbaugh families) first heard a Hammond organ while in the fourth grade and was “mesmerized” by the combination of organ and electronics, a combination that would shape his career. Brombaugh has degrees in Electrical Engineering from the University of Cincinnati (EE, 1960) and Cornell University (MS-EE, 1963) specializing in the field of acoustics, in particular musical acoustics.

After college graduation, Brombaugh worked as a development engineer for the Baldwin Piano Company. His charge "was to develop a method to produce electronic chiff and to design an artificial reverberation system". For the former, he extensively studied the construction of organ pipes, while the latter included ideas pioneered in the Hammond organ. Brombaugh also secured seven patents with the Baldwin Organ Company.

As a lifelong lover of classical music, especially as he heard ancient European organs on recordings – e.g. E. Power Biggs' The Art of the Organ and Helmut Walcha's of J.S. Bach's music on the Schnitger organ in Cappel – he became an apprentice under the two leading American tracker action pipe organ builders, Fritz Noack (1964–1966) and Charles Fisk (1966–1967) and then served as a journeyman (Geselle) with the Rudolph von Beckerath firm in Hamburg in 1967–68 to complete his training, especially in making reed pipes. While in Hamburg, Brombaugh used every opportunity to study the many historic organs in northwest Germany and the adjacent Netherlands.

In June 1968, he established his own firm, John Brombaugh & Co., in the farmlands west of Germantown, Ohio, his hometown; this sole proprietorship eventually became a partnership including George Taylor, John Boody, Herman Greunke, and others. In 1977, the partnership dissolved in a friendly way when Brombaugh moved his firm to Eugene, Oregon under the new name, John Brombaugh & Associates, Inc., that continued until completing its final instrument in summer 2005. He built 66 organs that are located in 23 states, Canada, Sweden, and Japan, and was a teacher to many upcoming younger builders, including Bruce Shull, Michael Bigelow, Charles Ruggles, Paul Fritts, Munetaka Yokota, Bruce Fowkes, Trent Buhr, Karl Nelson, David Petty, and Aaron Reichert. A grant from the Ford Foundation in spring 1971 enabled Brombaugh to do intense study of about 100 historic organs in Germany, the Netherlands, France, Switzerland, Austria, and Italy, and he has continued his studies at all possible times since.

== Organ building style ==
The majority of Brombaugh organs are tuned in a "Well temperament". This enables them to play music composed in any key but, compared with Equal Temperament, favors the central keys used in most organ literature of all periods. Since its introduction in 1978, the "Bach" temperament by Herbert Anton Kellner has become Brombaugh's standard tuning, though several of his organs are tuned in 1/4 Syntonic comma Meantone where their primary intention is for historically oriented performance of the organ literature older than that of Johann Sebastian Bach's. Many of his easily movable small positives have transposition capabilities to facilitate their playability at different pitches; these (excepting his Op. 2 that was made during his apprenticeship with Noack) are his only instruments tuned in Equal Temperament.

Although he has been interested in recovering and using many of the concepts from ancient organ-builders (e.g., the use of only mechanical key action), he also considers himself a builder of his time who is amenable to the use of current construction methods and ideas for the convenience required by contemporary organists. For example, his Opus 35 – an organ of 3,250 pipes, 3 manuals, and pedal with 46 stops that was dedicated on Pentecost 2001 at the First Presbyterian Church in Springfield, Illinois – is a synthesis of historical and modern techniques.

Among John Brombaugh's contributions to modern organ-building are:

- The first use in modern times of an unequal temperament for tuning a large pipe organ in North America on his Op. 4 at First Lutheran Church, Lorain, Ohio, that was dedicated by David Boe in June 1970. The temperament used was Andreas Werckmeister's IIIrd temperament, Werckmeister's first inventive departure from the ancient Pythagorean or Meantone tunings. This temperament has since been used on many new organs worldwide.
- General absence of plywood in the construction of his instruments, especially in the casework, and by the earliest return in 20th century organ-building (beginning in 1968) to using only solid wood for the windchest tableboards.
- Consistent use of fine architectural concepts and details for his case designs, such as those described by the renowned Renaissance artisan, Andrea Palladio, and those found in instruments made by the late Gothic builders. He has also been interested in developing designs with suitable modern styles where appropriate, not only to making historically governed copies.
- The first use of hammered pipe metal in modern times in the United States, also done for his Op. 4 for Lorain, Ohio.
- Beginning in 1970 with his Op. 4 for Lorain, Ohio, consistent use of wedge bellows in all of his work to provide a slightly unstable winding that gives the organ a more musical character or "life". A few of Brombaugh's instruments have the mechanism needed so the organ's wind can be produced by foot pumping its bellows – the norm before electricity (or other energy sources) took over this rather boring job.
- Beginning in 1970, development and use of an electronic "tuning machine" having a CRT display that can be set for any temperament and a reference pitch variable over a 4:5 ratio; the device provides an accuracy of 1/5 cent or 0.1 Hz and also has a filter settable to observe the various harmonics individually so all pipes of compound stops (such as the Mixtures and Cornets) may be very accurately tuned.
- The first use worldwide of the high lead content pipe metal alloy such as was found in the work of Hendrik Niehoff in 16th century northwestern Europe in Brombaugh's Op. 19 at Central Lutheran Church in Eugene, Oregon.
- Among the first uses of Meantone tuning in a major new organ in the United States, (along with Charles Fisk's organ at Houghton Memorial Chapel at Wellesley College and Gene Bedient's organ at Augustana College in Rock Island, Illinois) for his Op. 25 organ for Fairchild Chapel at Oberlin College that was dedicated in September 1981 by Harald Vogel. Meantone organs in North America remain very rare.
- The general use of "vocale" voicing of the pipes to achieve the tonal beauty so common to the organs in and prior to Bach's lifetime.
- First installation in Continental Europe since the 1930s of a new pipe organ built in the United States – the Meantone organ for the Hagakyrkan in Gothenburg, Sweden, dedicated by Harald Vogel on March 8, 1992.
- First use of the Ruckpositive in a major concert hall organ by using two Ruckpositive divisions to the left and right so the organist is not hidden from view of the audience, in the Toyota City, Japan, Op. 37 instrument inaugurated by Harald Vogel on November 11, 2003.

== Awards ==
- Montgomery County, Ohio, Brombaugh won the design prize awarded to Montgomery County high school students; his home design was built for 1955 Home Show at the county fairgrounds.
- Ford Foundation, 1971, awarded for financial support to study historic organs in Europe.
- University of Cincinnati, College of Engineering Distinguished Alumni Award (1981)
- Oregon Governor's Arts Award (1996)
- University of Oregon's Distinguished Service Award (2006)
- Oberlin Conservatory of Music, Honorary Doctorate (2022)

== Organs of note ==
Location	City	Opus	Year
Episcopal Church of the Resurrection	Eugene, Oregon, US	38a	2004
Trinity Lutheran Church	Ithaca, New York, US	2	1966
First Lutheran Church; Destroyed by fire August 28, 2014	Lorain, Ohio, US	4	1970
Ashland Avenue Baptist Church; Church closed October 2006, organ moved to Sacred Heart Cathedral, Rochester, NY, for use by Eastman Rochester students, organ moved to St. Michael's Church, Rochester, NY (Video on YouTube) installed in 2014 in Schroeder Hall at Sonoma State University	Toledo, Ohio, US Rochester, New York, US Rohnert Park, California, US	9	1972
Private residence practice organ	Nebraska, US	12b	1973
First Methodist Church	Oberlin, Ohio, US	15	1974
Grace Episcopal Church	Ellensburg, Washington, US	16	1974
Central Lutheran Church	Eugene, Oregon, US	19	1976
St. John's Presbyterian Church	Berkeley, California, US	20	1979
St. Mark's Episcopal Chapel	Storrs, Connecticut, US	21	1979
Christ Episcopal Church	Tacoma, Washington, US	22	1980
St. Paul's Lutheran Church	Durham, North Carolina, US	23d	1977
Fairchild Chapel, Oberlin College	Oberlin, Ohio, US	25	1981
Collegedale Seventh-day Adventist Church	Collegedale, Tennessee, US	26	1986
Southern Adventist University (Ackerman Auditorium)	Collegedale, Tennessee, US	27	1986
Haga Church	Göteborg, Sweden	28	1992
Music School Recital Hall, Iowa State University	Ames, Iowa, US	29	1987
Pilgrim Lutheran Church	Beaverton, Oregon, US	30	1987
St. Barnabas Anglican Church	Victoria, British Columbia, Canada	31f	1988
Christ Church, Christiana Hundred, Episcopal	Wilmington, Delaware, US	32	1990
Memorial Chapel, Lawrence University	Appleton, Wisconsin, US	33	1995
Memorial Chapel, Duke University	Durham, North Carolina, US	34	1997
First Presbyterian Church	Springfield, Illinois, US	35	2001
Toyota City Concert Hall	Toyota City, Aichi Prefecture, Japan	37	2002
Florence Henry Memorial Chapel (Brombaugh's final instrument)	Seattle, Washington, US	38b	2005
