= Clearfield Progress =

Newspaper in Pennsylvania, United States

- Type: Daily
- Format: Broadsheet
- Owner(s): Community Media Group
- Founded: 1913
- Headquarters: 236 E. Market St, Clearfield, PA 16830
- Circulation: 12,000
- OCLC number: 12136352
- Website: www.theprogressnews.com

The Clearfield Progress is a daily newspaper serving Clearfield in the U.S. state of Pennsylvania. It was founded in 1913 as successor to the Clearfield Herald.

It has a circulation of about 12,000 and is published six days a week.

== History ==
This newspaper was originally a vehicle for progressive politics and the "Bull Moosers", and the 1913 change in ownership and renewed focus led to an immediate jump in subscribers. (The progressive party in Pennsylvania at the time was known as the "Washington Party" for historical reasons.)

It was bought by a group of business people with John Bixler put in as editor. It opposed the re-election of Senator Boies Penrose in 1913.

In 1914, the paper accused then-gubernatorial candidate Martin Brumbuagh of being drunk while touring Clearfield county during his campaign. Bixler apologized for reprinting what was a possible lie. Henry Stough, an anti-liquor activist, had made the accusation and the paper had mentioned the attack. Bixler initially stated that because the paper had not made the assertion and just reported the attack, the event was correctly reported. Stough also claimed he had not directly said Brumbaugh was drunk

In 1945, publisher G. Albert Stewart urged newspapers to support the World War II effort, even in the last days of the war. Braton Gardner soon succeeded him as publisher.

The Progress was sold to the Community Media Group in 2015.
