= Brumbaugh =

Brumbaugh is a surname. Notable people with the surname include:

- Carl Brumbaugh (1906–1969), American football quarterback
- Clement L. Brumbaugh (1863–1921), U.S. Representative from Ohio
- Cliff Brumbaugh (born 1974), American baseball player
- David Brumbaugh (1960–2017), American politician
- D. Emmert Brumbaugh (1894–1977), Republican member of the U.S. House of Representatives from Pennsylvania
- John Brombaugh (born 1937), American pipe organ builder
- Martin A. Brumbaugh (fl. 1940s, American statistician
- Martin Grove Brumbaugh (1862–1930), Pennsylvania's 25th Governor, a Republican

== See also ==
- Samuel Kinsey (1832–1883), son of Elizabeth Brumbaugh (1809–1860)
- Paul Flory (1910–1985), son of Martha Brumbaugh (1871–1960)
