= Kaire =

Unisex given name

Kaire is a unisex given name.

Female

- Kaire Kaljurand (born 1974), Estonian footballer
- Kaire Kimsen (born 1978), Estonian footballer
- Kaire Leibak (born 1988), Estonian triple jumper
- Kaire Nõmm (born 1971), Estonian architect
- Kaire Vilgats (born 1976), Estonian singer and actress

Male

- Kaire Mbuende (born 1953), Namibian politician and diplomat
