= Jackson Township, Kosciusko County, Indiana =

Jackson Township
- Township
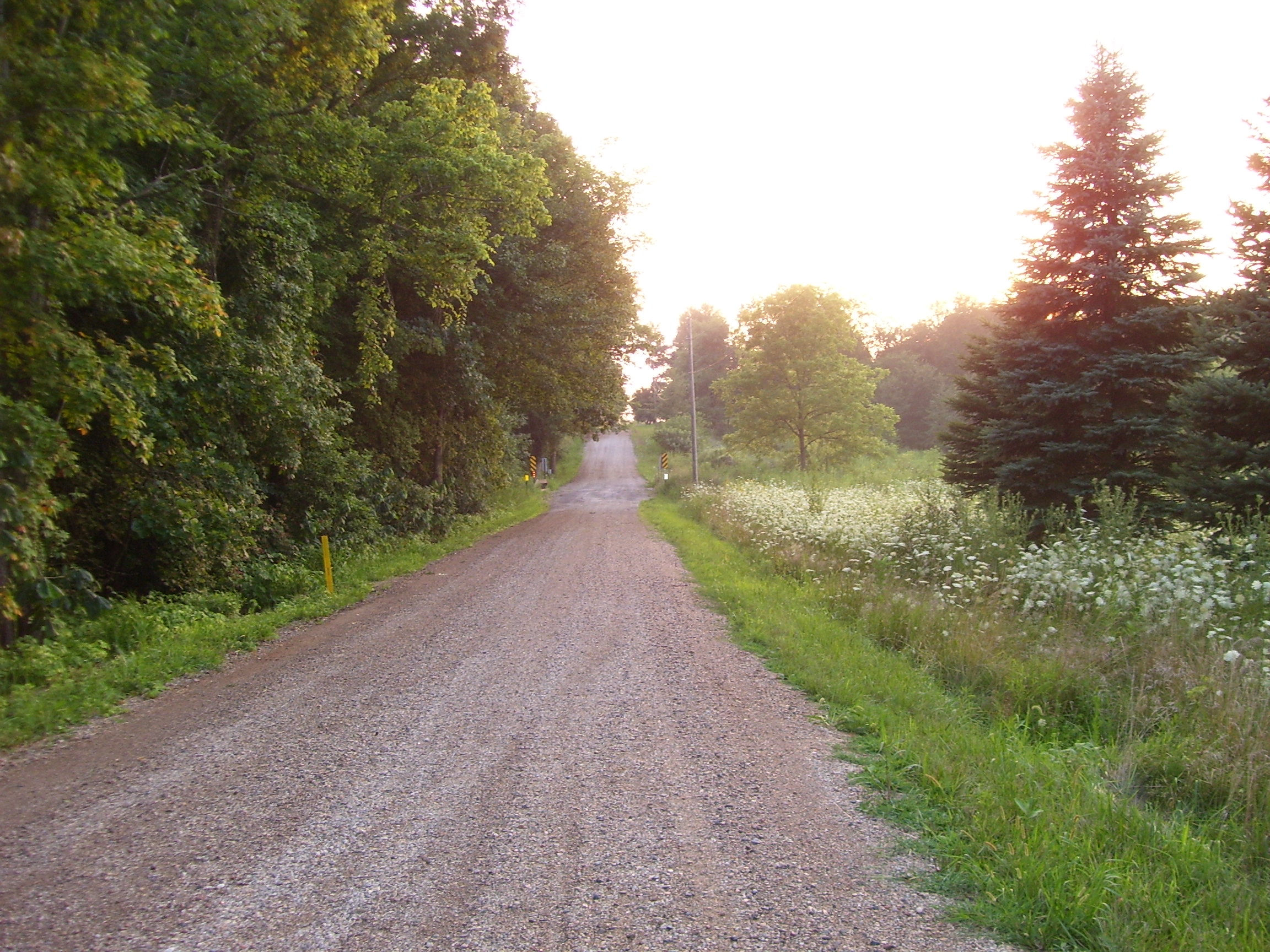
- County Road 1200 S. in southeastern Jackson Township

- Coordinates: 41°04′43″N 85°44′09″W
- Country: United States
- State: Indiana
- County: Kosciusko

Government
  - Type: Indiana township

Area
  - Total: 29.01 sq mi (75.1 km^{2})
  - Land: 28.76 sq mi (74.5 km^{2})
  - Water: 0.24 sq mi (0.62 km^{2})
- Elevation: 863 ft (263 m)

Population (2020)
  - Total: 1,233
  - Density: 43/sq mi (17/km^{2})
- Time zone: UTC-5 (Eastern (EST))
  - Summer (DST): UTC-4 (EDT)
- FIPS code: 18-37170
- GNIS feature ID: 453453

Jackson Township is one of seventeen townships in Kosciusko County, Indiana. As of the 2020 census, its population was 1,233 (slightly down from 1,238 at 2010) and it contained 509 housing units.

Jackson Township was organized in 1838.

== Geography ==
According to the 2010 census, the township has a total area of 29.01 square miles (75.1 km^{2}), of which 28.76 square miles (74.5 km^{2}) (or 99.14%) is land and 0.24 square miles (0.62 km^{2}) (or 0.83%) is water.

=== Cities and towns ===
- Sidney

=== Unincorporated towns ===
- Kinsey at 41.0961562°N 85.7049849°W

(This list is based on USGS data and may include former settlements.)
