= Meantone organs in North America =

Pipe organs that are tuned in meantone temperament are very rare in North America. They are listed here, by type of temperament and sorted by date of construction. North America is defined here as Canada, the United States of America and Mexico. All instruments listed are playable but unplayable instruments may be added with a note.

== Organs in 1/4 syntonic comma meantone tuning ==
=== Historic organs ===
- University of Rochester, Memorial Art Gallery (Rochester, NY). Anonymous, ca. 1700/1770. Originally from Naples region or Tuscany.
- Tlacochahuaya, Convent of San Jerónimo (San Jerónimo Tlacochahuaya, Oaxaca, Mexico). Anonymous, ca. 1725–1730. Colonial Spanish style.
- Zautla (San Andrés Zautla, Oaxaca, Mexico). Anonymous, 1726. Colonial Spanish style.

=== New organs ===
- Wellesley College, Houghton Chapel (Wellesley, MA). C. B. Fisk Inc., Opus 72, 1981. Instrument includes sub-semitones or split keys. North German, Danish and Dutch 16th- and 17th-century style.
- Augustana College (Rock Island, IL). Bedient Organ Company, Opus 16, 1981. Italian 17th-century style.
- Oberlin College, Fairchild Chapel (Oberlin, OH). John Brombaugh, Op. 25, 1981. 17th-century North German style.
- Southern Adventist University (Collegedale, TN). John Brombaugh, Op. 27, 1983. Two-manual organ with sub-semitones and short octave.
- Oberlin Conservatory (Oberlin, OH), formerly at University of California, Pacific Lutheran Theological Seminary Chapel (Berkeley, CA). Greg Harrold, Opus 11, 1989. Spanish early 18th-century style.
- Mission San Jose (San Jose, CA). Rosales Organ Builders, 1989. 18th-century Spanish and Mexican style.
- St. Barnabas Episcopal Church (Berlin, NH). Bedient Pipe Organ Company, Opus 37, 1993. Originally built as a residence organ for Susan Ferré in Kingston, OK.
- Duke University, Memorial Chapel (Durham, NC). John Brombaugh, Op. 34, 1997. Great (lower manual keyboard) primarily in Tuscan-Italian Renaissance style, with 17th-century North German elements at rear; upper manual is 17th-century North German style Brustwerck. Pedal entirely transmitted from Great.
- St. Cecilia Cathedral (Omaha, NE), Pasi Organ Builders, Opus 14, 2003. Instrument is dual temperament, alternatively Well-Tempered. North German, Italian and French 17th- and 18th-century style.
- Yale University, Marquand Chapel (New Haven, CT). Taylor & Boody Organbuilders, Opus 55, 2007. Instrument includes sub-semitones (split keys). North German and Dutch 17th-century style.
- Stanford University, Memorial Chapel (Palo Alto, CA). Paul Fritts & Co. Organ Builders, Opus 17, 1995. Danish 16th-century style, one manual/8 stops.
- Musée de l'Amérique Française (Museum of French America) (Quebec, QC), Juget-Sinclair, Opus 35, 2010. 18th-century French style.
- Baylor University, Recital Hall II (Waco, TX). Fratelli Ruffatti, 1973. Italian neo-classical style.

== Organs in 1/5 comma, 1/6 comma and other meantone tunings ==
=== Historic organs ===
- Yanhuitlan, Temple and Exconvent of Saint Dominic, (Santo Domingo Yanhuitlán, Oaxaca, Mexico). Anonymous, 18th century "Rameau" temperament (modified meantone), Classic Spanish style.
- Cathedral of Our Lady of the Assumption (Oaxaca City, Oaxaca, Mexico). 1/6 comma meantone. The organ has a complicated history and was restored in 1997. Classic Spanish style.
- Mexico City Metropolitan Cathedral (Mexico City, Federal District, Mexico). Both organs by Joseph Nassarre, 1734–1736, with subsequent modifications in the 18th and 19th centuries. Classic Spanish style. The choir facades were damaged by fire in 1967 and the organs were restored in 1978. The Gospel organ was recently re-restored and the Epistle organ is currently being worked on.

=== New organs ===
- Knox College Chapel (Toronto, ON). Wolff & Associés, Opus 33, 1991. Swedish early 18th-century style.
- Mount Holyoke College (South Hadley, MA). C. B. Fisk Inc., Opus 84, 1985. 1/5 comma meantone, Italian 17th-century style.
- Stanford University, Memorial Church (Palo Alto, CA). C. B. Fisk Inc., Opus 85, 1985. Modified 1/5 comma meantone (by Fisk, Vogel and Lindley), dual temperament instrument alternatively Well-Tempered. North German, French and Dutch 17th- and 18th-century style.
- University of North Texas, Main Auditorium (Denton, TX). Gene Bedient, 1985. Tuning after Michel Collette. French, late 18th-century style. Formerly installed in St. Mark's Episcopal Church (Grand Rapids, MI).
- Paul Fritts residence (Tacoma, WA). Paul Fritts & Co. Organ Builders, 1988. Originally built for Jeff Smith; moved to Christ Episcopal Church (Rochester, NY) and then to the builder's residence in 2007. Danish 16th-century style, 2 manuals/10 stops.
- University of Calgary, Rozsa Centre (Calgary, AB). Jürgen Ahrend Orgelbau, 2006. "Norden" temperament (modified meantone). North German style.
- Mercer University (Macon, GA). Richards, Fowkes & Co. Opus 2 is a one-manual and pedal instrument tuned in 1/5-comma meantone after Norden.
- Church of the Covenant (Cleveland, OH). Richards, Fowkes & Co. Opus 19. Two-manual and pedal in 1/5-comma meantone at a'=415 Hz.

== Chamber Organs and Practice Instruments ==
=== Historic organs ===
- St Luke's Church (Smithfield, VA). Chamber organ, 1630, England. Currently unplayable.
- Metropolitan Museum of Art (New York City, NY). Chamber organ, ca. 1680s, Germany.
- Cornell University, Sage Chapel (Ithaca, NY). Chamber organ, Augustus Vicidomini (Naples), 1746. 1/4 comma meantone.
- Arizona State University (Tempe, AZ). Domenico Traeri, 1742. Originally from Modena, Italy. Formerly housed in St James Cathedral, Seattle. 1/4 comma meantone.
- University of California, Berkeley (Berkeley, CA). Chamber organ, ca. 1750, Germany. 1/4 comma meantone.
- University of Notre Dame (South Bend, IN). Anonymous, 18th or perhaps late 17th century. A 5-stop organ originally from Italy, restored by Martin Pasi of Pasi Organ Builders (Roy, WA) and Robert Wech of Wech Orgelbau (Buchloe, Germany)

=== New organs ===
- Practice organ, New England Conservatory (Boston, MA).
