= Marie Heleen Lisette Kikkas =

Estonian footballer

Marie Kikkas
Personal information
- Full name: Marie Heleen Lisette Kikkas
- Date of birth: 17 June 1996 (age 30)
- Place of birth: Tallinn, Estonia
- Position: Midfielder

Team information
- Current team: JK Tallinna Kalev
- Number: 8

Senior career*
Years	Team	Apps	(Gls)
- FC Flora

International career^{‡}
2013–2014	Estonia U-19	14	(0)
2020–	Estonia	1	(0)
- * Club domestic league appearances and goals ‡ National team caps and goals as of 18:02, 9 February 2021 (UTC)

Marie Heleen Lisette Kikkas (born 17 June 1996) is an Estonian footballer who plays as a midfielder for JK Tallinna Kalev and the Estonia women's national team.

== Early life ==
Kikkas' mother, Kadri Kimsen, and her aunt, Kaire Kimsen, also played for the Estonia women's football team and were the first pair of sisters to do so. Kadri Kimsen played in the first ever official match for Estonia, against Lithuania. Marie Kikkas started playing football at the age of eight. In addition to football, she danced and performed gymnastics. At the age of 15, she committed to football and played in a boys' team.

== Career ==
Kikkas played in Sweden for DFK Värmbol in 2016 and stayed there for one season. She made her debut for the Estonia national team on 1 December 2020 against Slovenia, coming on as a substitute for Kristina Bannikova.
