= Edward Brooks (educator) =

American educator and author

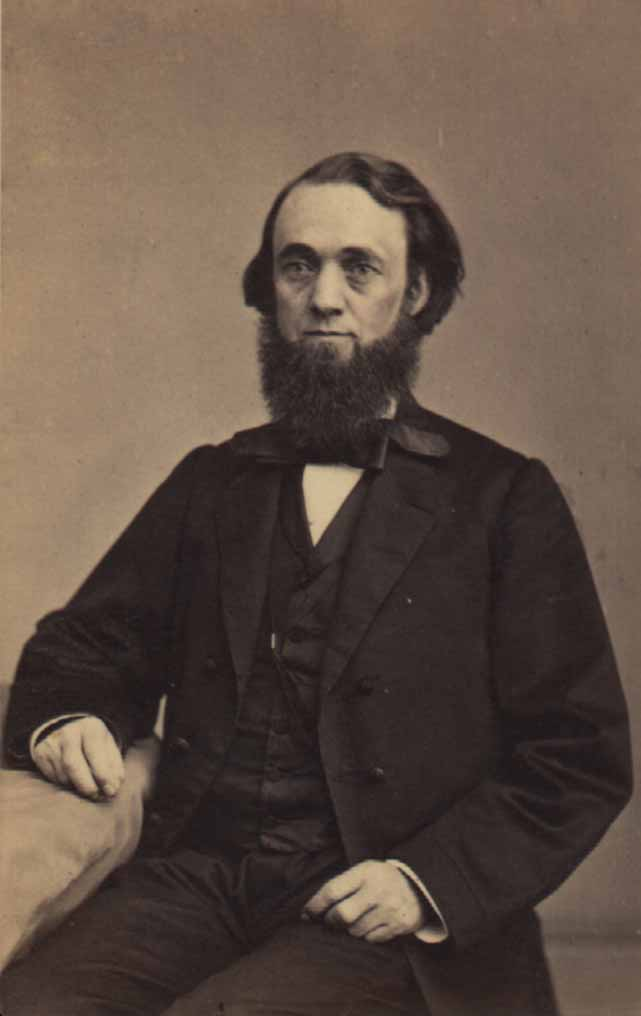
Edward Brooks

Edward Brooks (January 10, 1831 – June 29, 1912) was an American educator and author of numerous textbooks.

== Biography ==
Brooks was born in Stony Point, New York, in 1831. When fifteen years old he removed, with his father, to Sullivan County, New York, where he learned a trade, but occupied his leisure moments in study. At this time, he formed the habit of noting down and classifying important facts or thoughts, in which way he not only mastered the common-school branches, but many of the higher ones, becoming also expert in composition. His career as a teacher began with a singing-school held in a barn. He afterward taught a common school for six months, studied for one session in the normal institute at Liberty, New York, and then entered the University of Northern Pennsylvania, but was not graduated. He was teacher there in 1852–1853, taught mathematics in the Monticello, New York, academy, in 1854, and in 1855 accepted the professorship of mathematics in the State normal school at Millersville, Pennsylvania, of which he was principal from 1866 to 1886. Brooks was the author of a series of mathematical text-books (Philadelphia, 1858–77): Philosophy of Arithmetic (1876), Normal Methods of Teaching (Lancaster, Pa., 1879), Elocution and Reading (Philadelphia, 1882); and Mental Science and Culture (1883).

He died at his home in Philadelphia in 1912.

Educational offices
Preceded by James MacAlister	School District of Philadelphia Superintendent; 1891–1905	Succeeded by Martin G. Brumbaugh
