= Kinsey (surname) =

Kinsey is a surname. Notable people with the surname include:

- Alfred Kinsey (1894–1956), American entomologist and sexologist
- Angela Kinsey (born 1971), American actress
- Charles Kinsey (1773–1849), American politician
- Charles Kinsey (born 1968/9), American mental health therapist wounded by police
- Christine Kinsey (born 1942), Welsh painter
- Daniel Kinsey (1902–1970), American hurdler
- Darius Kinsey (1869–1945), American photographer
- Donald Kinsey (born 1953), American musician
- Erika Kinsey (born 1988), Swedish high jumper
- Howard Kinsey (1899–1966), American tennis player
- L. Christine Kinsey (born in 1950s), American mathematician
- Noel Kinsey (1925–2017), Welsh former footballer
- Robert Kinsey (1897–1984), American tennis player
- Samuel Kinsey (1832–1883), American Christian religious leader and publisher
- Tarence Kinsey (born 1984), American basketball player
- Timothy Kinsey, American politician
- Tony Kinsey (1927–2025), English jazz drummer and composer

== See also ==
- Kimsey
