= James A. MacAlister =

American academic administrator and lawyer

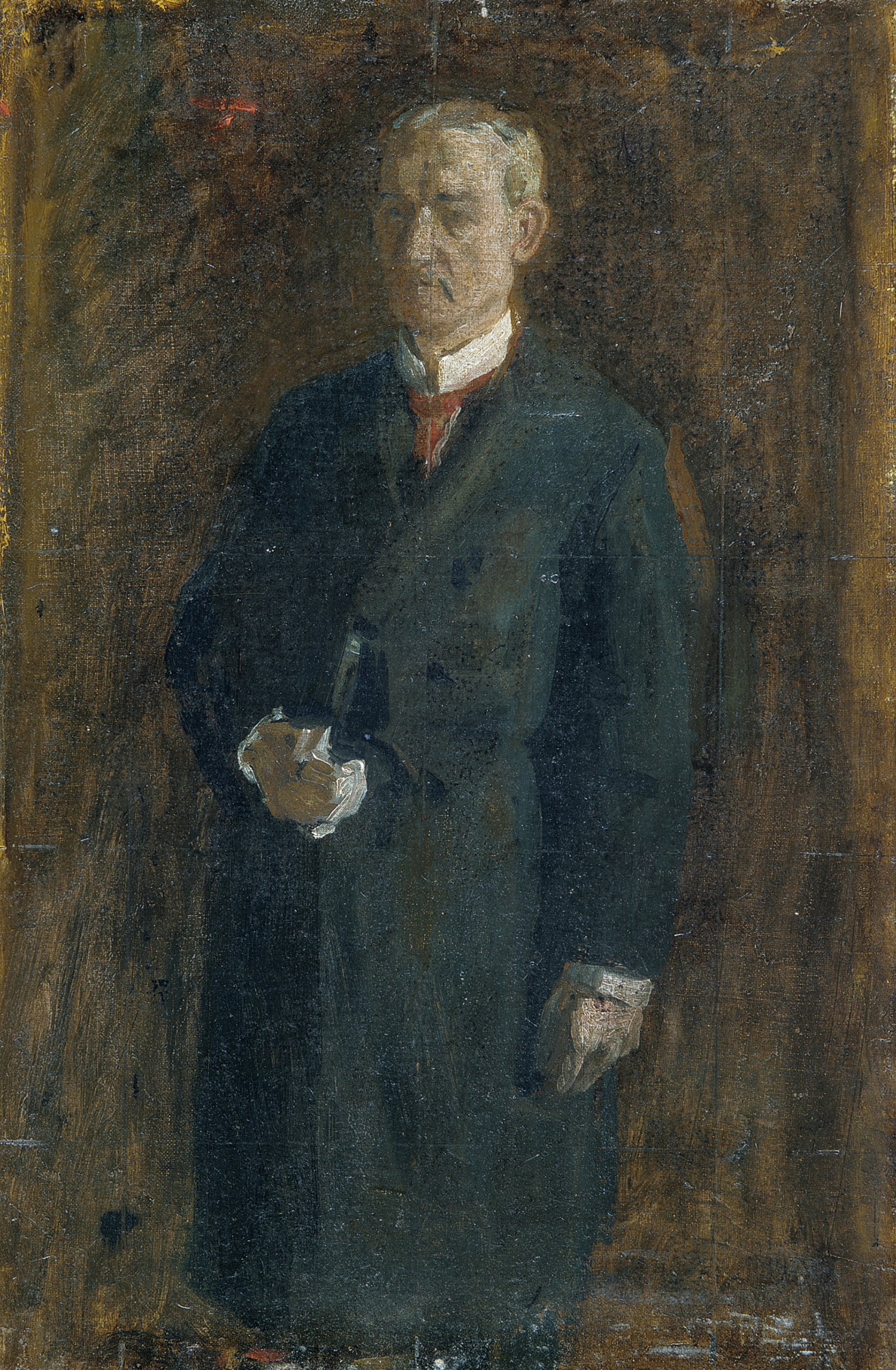
James MacAlister in 1895 by Thomas Eakins.

James A. MacAlister (April 26, 1840 – December 11, 1913) was a lawyer, school superintendent, and the first president of the Drexel Institute of Art, Science, and Industry.

== Early life ==
Born in Glasgow, Scotland, MacAlister emigrated to the U.S. state of Wisconsin in 1850 at the age of 10 with his family consisting of his mother and sisters. He graduated from Brown University in 1856 and then went on to study law at Albany Law School, graduating in 1864. After studying law for several years MacAlister took the position of first superintendent of Milwaukee's public school system in 1874. He then went on to become regent of the Wisconsin normal schools in 1878 following that position, MacAlister was appointed the first superintendent of the Philadelphia public school district in 1883.

== Drexel Institute of Art, Science, and Industry ==
MacAlister was appointed president of the Drexel Institute of Art, Science, and Industry in 1891, and took office on January 1, 1892. At the time of his appointment Drexel was not a degree granting institute but merely a "school for the study of design and for vocational training in the most general and best sense." MacAlister was chosen as president because his educational beliefs coincided with those of the Institute, including his advocation of practical and vocational training. Initially the Institute had a graduating class of 70 students however under MacAlister's long-term guidance the Institute expanded to a graduating class of over 500 by the time he resigned. MacAlister resigned on June 13, 1913 due to failing health and later died in December at sea on his way to Bermuda.

He was elected as a member of the American Philosophical Society in 1886.

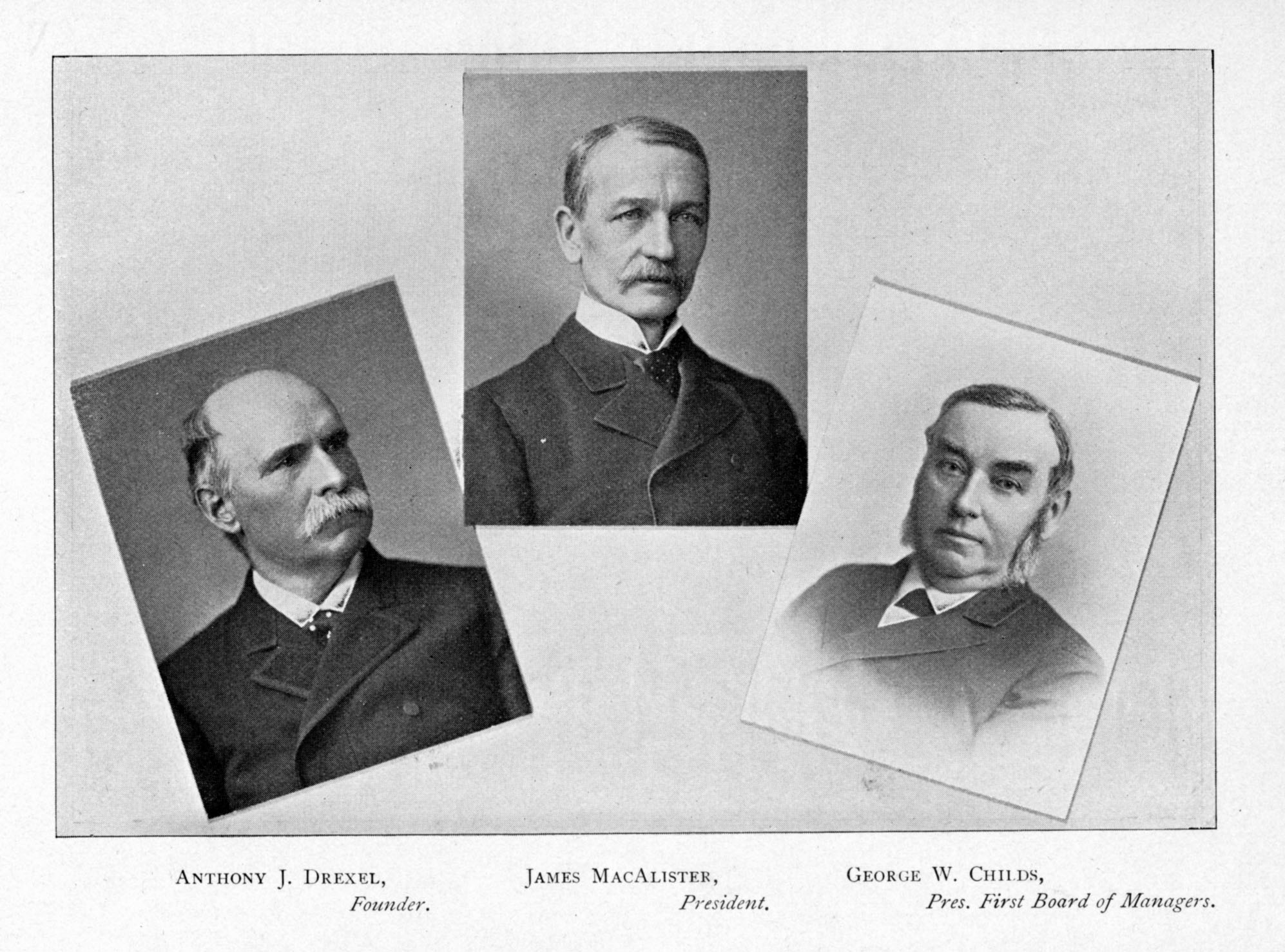
President MacAlister (center) with Anthony Drexel (left) and George W. Childs (right).

Educational offices
New title	School District of Philadelphia Superintendent; 1883–1891	Succeeded by Edward Brooks
