= A History of the German Baptist Brethren in Europe and America =

1899 book by Martin Grove Brumbaugh

A History of the German Baptist Brethren in Europe and North America is a book by Martin Grove Brumbaugh, A.M., Ph.D., written in 1899, published by the Brethren Publishing House at Mount Morris, Illinois. On the cover it is referred to only as A History of the Brethren. It was republished in 1961 by L. W. Shultz from North Manchester, Indiana, and Carl A. Wagner from Union Road, Clayton, Ohio, printed in February, 1961, and June, 1969.

== Historical context ==
Throughout the 1800s, the Brethren were skeptical of histories and record-keeping, as they were not to emulate their ancestors, but rather Jesus Christ, the Apostles, and the Early Church. However, by the end of the century enough changes were occurring that the Brethren, having great respect for the Brethren that came before them, were interested in Brethren history. At the German Baptist Brethren Annual Conference, a motion was passed approving the writing of a history of the Brethren; however, the motion did not specify an author. Brumbaugh was the first to complete the task in 1899. His book had great impact, based upon the value of tradition, and the lack of knowledge about Brethren history.

== Bias ==
Contemporary Brethren historians generally consider this history quite biased. Brumbaugh was a strong advocate for several progressive positions, especially education, participation in politics, and reconsidering plain dress, positions which the Brethren had long opposed. These historical positions are not so clear, and sometimes contradicted in Brumbaugh's history.

== Editions ==
- Brumbaugh, Martin Grove (1899). A history of the German Baptist Brethren in Europe and America (1st ed.). Elgin, IL: Brethren Publishing House – via Internet Archive.
- Brumbaugh, Martin Grove (1910). A history of the German Baptist Brethren in Europe and America (2nd ed.). Elgin, IL: Brethren Publishing House – via Internet Archive.
