= McKinsey (disambiguation) =

McKinsey & Company is an American worldwide management consulting firm.

McKinsey may also refer to:

- McKinsey (surname), a surname
- McKinsey 7S Framework, a management model
- McKinsey Quarterly, a business magazine for senior executives
- McKinsey Award, awarded by the Harvard Business Review

== See also ==
- McKinley (disambiguation)
- Kinsey (disambiguation)
