= Kinsey, Indiana =

- Unincorporated community
- Location within Indiana Location within the United States
- Coordinates: 41°05′46″N 85°42′18″W
- Country: United States
- State: Indiana
- County: Kosciusko
- Township: Jackson
- Elevation: 866 ft (264 m)
- Time zone: UTC-5 (Eastern (EST))
  - Summer (DST): UTC-4 (EDT)
- ZIP code: 46510
- GNIS feature ID: 437345

Kinsey or Kinzie was an unincorporated town in Jackson Township, Kosciusko County, in the U.S. state of Indiana. Platted in the 1880s with the hope of becoming a thriving town along the new rail line (the Nickel Plate Road), after some brief growth in the 1890s, it largely reverted to only a train stop. A small portion of the original town plat stayed in place until 2017.

== Geography ==
The community was located around the intersection of County Road 950S and County Road 700E, about 3.5 miles east of Sidney along the rail line.

== History ==
The railroad was extended to Kinsey in the early 1880s. A post office opened as Kinzie in 1882, and remained in operation until it was discontinued in 1907.

Kinsey was platted in 1883 with 80 lots; early on it was listed as Kinzie in documents. There was a general store there until at least 1911. The location proved less than ideal for a train station, because the rail line had an uphill grade when it passed the station, so when trains stopped they had to back down the slope before starting again. The difficulty of trains stopping, the burning down of the local sawmill, in addition to the relative greater success of nearby towns like Sidney and Packerton to the west, and the rise of automobile use, all contributed to Kinsey's failure to thrive. Much of the town plat was vacated in 1924 for farm use, and a 1990s county history reports that nothing existed of the town by the 1930s. However, a small portion of the original plat remained in place until 2017.

The population was 25 in 1890, and was 28 in 1900.

== See also ==
- Gravelton, Indiana
