= First Presbyterian Church (Springfield, Illinois) =

Coordinates: 39°47′55.1″N 89°38′49.1″W

First Presbyterian Church, Springfield, Illinois
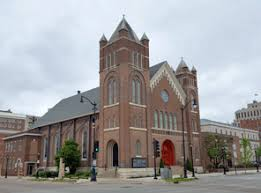
- Church Exterior
- First Presbyterian Church, Springfield, Illinois
- Location: Springfield, Illinois
- Country: U.S.A
- Denomination: Presbyterian Church (USA)
- Website: www.lincolnschurch.org

History
- Status: Church
- Founded: December 15, 1828
- Founder: Rev. John M. Ellis

Architecture
- Architect: L. D. Cleveland
- Style: Gothic Revival, Romanesque
- Years built: 1866-1868
- Construction cost: $65,000

Specifications
- Capacity: 400
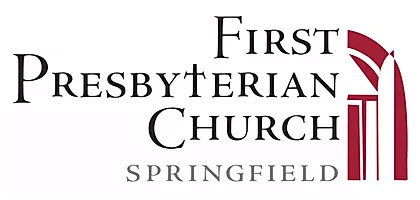

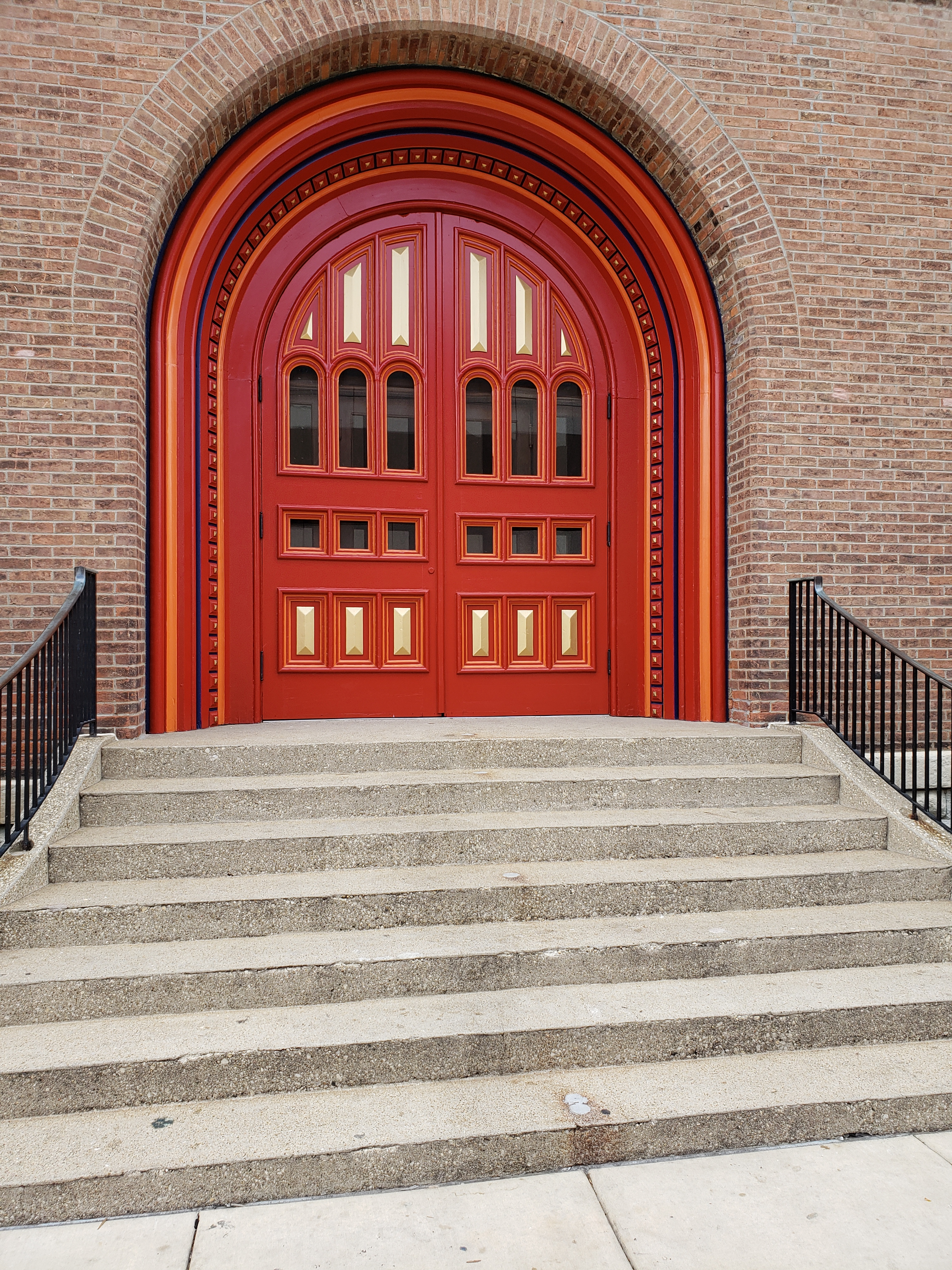
The iconic red doors to the church

First Presbyterian Church is a congregation of the Presbyterian Church (U.S.A) located in downtown Springfield, Illinois. This is the church that President Abraham Lincoln and his family attended while they lived in Springfield.

== History ==
The First Presbyterian Church origins date back to 1828, just ten years after Illinois became a state. The first church building was in the block that is currently between 3rd and 4th Streets and between Washington and Monroe Streets in downtown Springfield. That building served the church from 1830 until 1843, when it could no longer accommodate the growing congregation. A new church building was built just north of the original building, at what is now the southwest corner of 3rd Street and Washington.

The church's current building at 7th Street and Capitol Avenue was originally built for the Third Presbyterian Church of Springfield, which offered to sell it to First Presbyterian in 1872. The cornerstone for the building was laid in 1866 and dedicated in 1868.

== Lincoln's ties to the church ==
Abraham Lincoln's association with the church began in 1850 and continued until he left Springfield to assume the duties of President in 1861. In 1850, when Abraham and Mary Lincoln's second son, Edward, died, the minister of First Presbyterian Church was asked to conduct the funeral. The minister at that time was Rev. James Smith and his service made a deep impression on both of the bereaved parents.

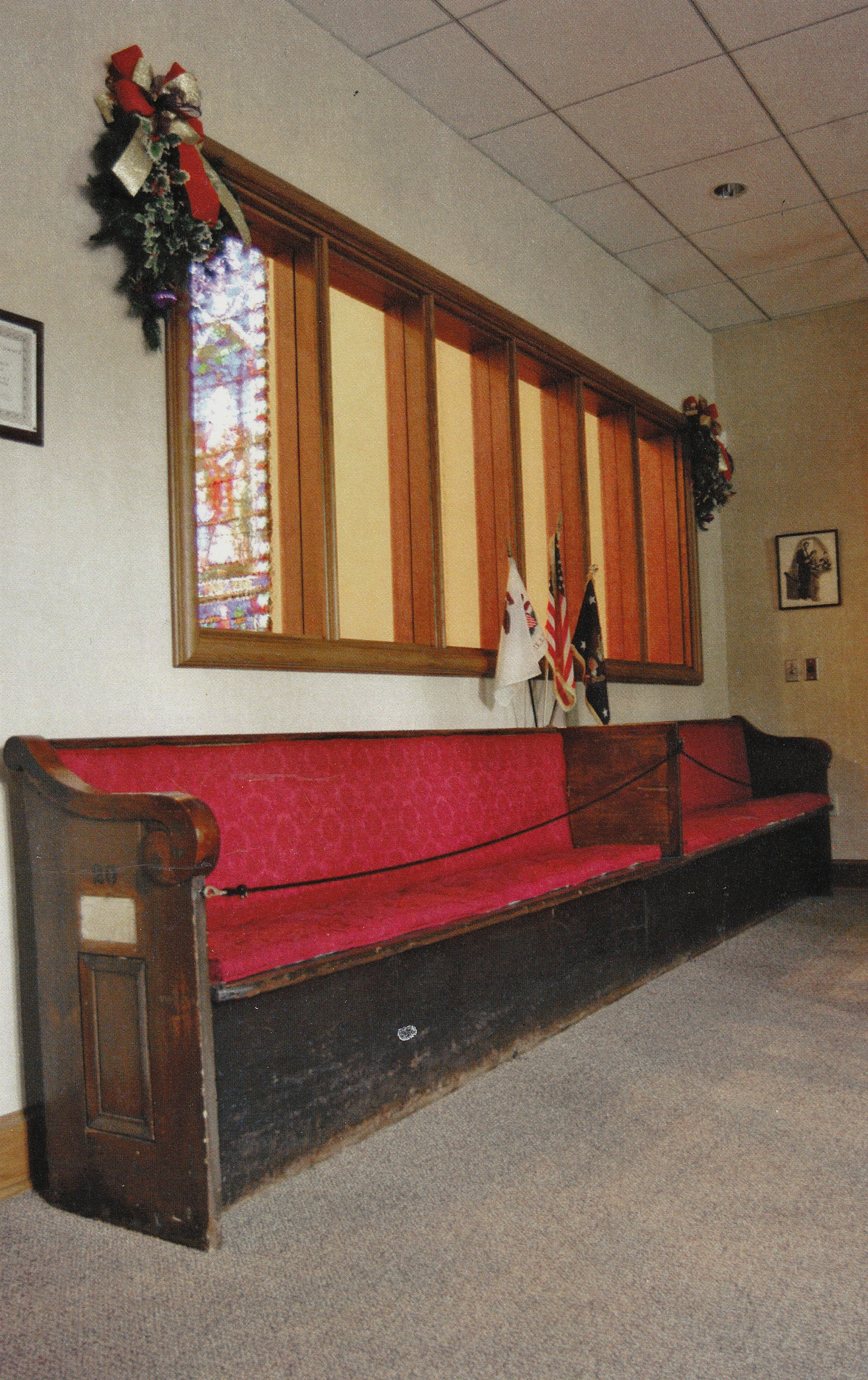
Lincoln family pew

The Lincolns rented a pew and regularly attended church services. The annual pew rental was $36.00. Mr. Lincoln, however, never formally joined the church, although this wife became a member on October 13, 1852. The pew was saved from the wrecking ball and relocated to the current church building in 1912.

== Current building ==
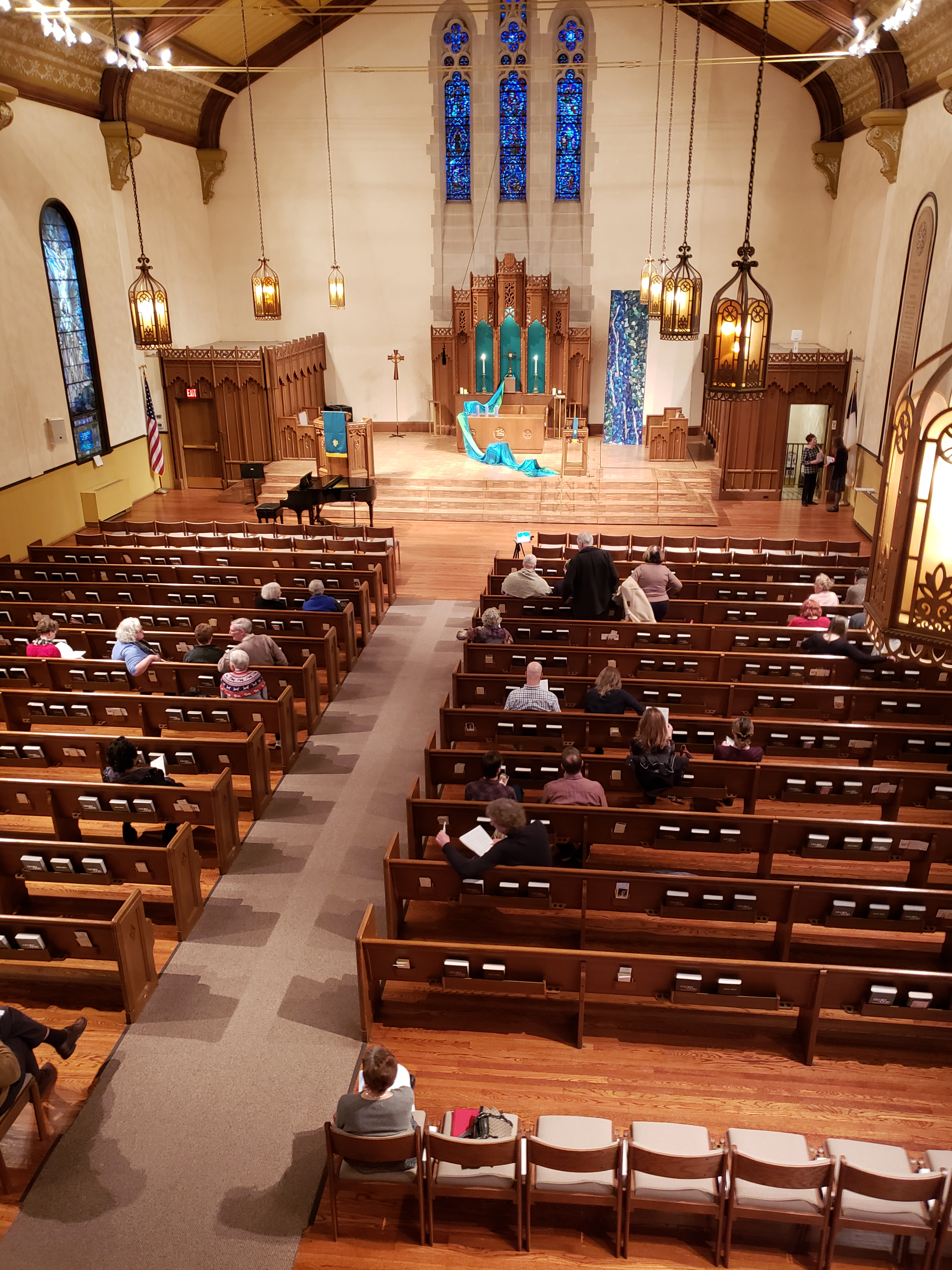
The current Sanctuary

The current building, at 7th St. and Capitol Ave. was built in 1868. The building was purchased from Third Presbyterian Church of Springfield in 1876. While President Lincoln never visited the current church building, his wife Mary Todd Lincoln had her funeral here, on July 19, 1882. Mary welcomed her own death in many ways, say historians, after the loss of three sons and her husband to assassination. A letter written to her son, Robert, in August 1874 outlines specific instructions for a funeral that was still eight years away.

The exterior of the church sanctuary, dating from 1868, has changed little except for the removal of the original tall spires, but it is now buttressed by a steel superstructure. The interior, however, has been remodeled several times, with the most extensive changes being made in the early 1940s. Originally, it featured a center-raised pulpit on a stage-like platform and two side aisles dividing the nave into three sections, rather than the present central aisle dividing the nave in two. Exposed organ pipes were a focal point of the chancel area. The original building interior, with its rounded arches and central focus, contained elements of the Romanesque style. The original sanctuary windows were the same size and in the same places as the present memorial windows, while the current chancel windows replaced the organ pipes during the 1940s renovation. An addition was put onto the west side of the building in 1928. A chapel, north of the sanctuary, was added in 1945.

First Presbyterian Church's decision to install memorial windows in the 1890s reflected a growing religious revival and a trend of paying tribute to the ministry of church leaders through colorful windows depicting biblical themes. Springfield participated fully in the general prosperity of the period: construction and business had flourished, and the legendary hardships of the frontier had been ameliorated by the supply of goods transported in by rail and the ever-increasing river traffic. During the Lincoln Era, many of Springfield's citizens became familiar with the sophistication found in the cities on the Eastern seaboard and wanted to emulate those cosmopolitan styles.

=== Tiffany windows ===
The Sanctuary features seven windows designed by Louis Comfort Tiffany. Prominent families worked directly with Tiffany Studios to make each window to the family's instruction – thus each window is unique. Later, the church commissioned a different East Coast studio to produce the remaining windows along the north and south elevations of the sanctuary in a more medieval style. Although these windows appear to be the oldest, they are the newest in the collection.

==== Angel of the Resurrection ====
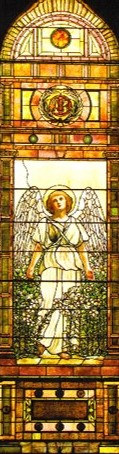
Angel of the Resurrection

The oldest window is the Angel of the Resurrection. The central panel was part of the Tiffany Chapel at the Colombian Exposition of 1893 in Chicago. Several members of the congregation went to the Exposition and purchased the window. When the Exposition closed, the panel was moved down to Springfield, and craftsmen from Tiffany came and made the memorial plaque and set the window in 1884.

This window was not donated by a family. Instead it was dedicated by the students of Mrs. Mary Mickey Holmes, principal of the Betty Stuart Institute. Betty Stuart Institute was a finishing school for young ladies from the 1850s to the 1930s.

==== Saint Barnabas ====
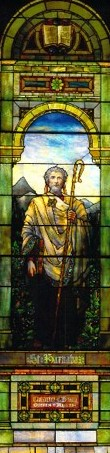
St. Barnabas

Installed in 1906, this is the only Tiffany window in the group featuring a male figure. The window is named for C.C. Brown, husband of Betty Stuart. Mr. Brown was a lawyer and spent most of his later years dedicated to church work, making the choice of the window theme all the more appropriate. In Acts 13:2, the Holy Spirit requested, “Separate me Barnabas and Saul for the work where unto I have called them” (KJV). Those great friends and missionary workers modeled the working relationship that grew between C. C. Brown and the then pastor, Dr. Thomas D. Logan.

==== Angel with Cherubs ====
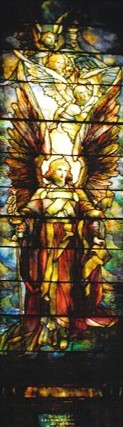
Angel with Cherubs

Installed in 1920, this is a memorial for their parents by the Stuve children. Bernard Stuve was a successful frontier doctor, trained lawyer, writer of a respected state history, and owner of a large farm. Mrs. Stuve and her daughters played an active role in church life and the daughters offered this window as a way to continue the family name in church history. The window features multi-hued pieces of glass that change with the light. Tiffany used one or two sheets of clear glass over the faces of the cherubs to create the illusion of distance.

==== Angel of Victory ====
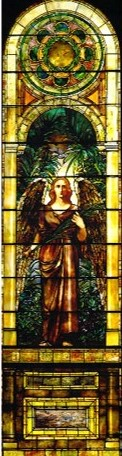
Angel of Victory

Installed in the late 1890s, this window is a memorial to Benjamin Stephenson Edwards, the son of Ninian Edwards. Mr. Edwards sister, Julia Edwards, married Congressman Daniel Pope Cook. Their son, John Pope Cook, would later become a mayor of Springfield. Mr. Edwards brother, Albert Gallatin Edwards, would later become the founder of brokerage firm A. G. Edwards. Both families were members of the church.

The Angel of Victory stands in a bower of palms, a symbol of victory, surrounded by the passionflower as a symbol of Christ's suffering. The colors used in this window glow softly when the light shines through the glass. This window, along with the Angel of Communion, were installed at roughly the same time in 1890 and bear the nameplate of “Tiffany Glass & Decorating Company” a trademark of the 1890s.

==== Angel of Communion ====
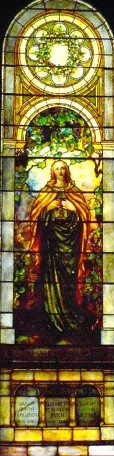
Angel of Communion

Installed in the late 1890s, this window was donated by the Bunn family. Jacob Bunn Sr., commissioned this window from Tiffany to memorialize the loss of his mother-in-law, wife and daughter. He lost his wife and mother-in-law the same year and lost his daughter six years later.

The Angel of Communion, so titled by church records, depicts a wingless angel holding a chalice and standing in a bower of grapes.

==== The Perfect Woman ====
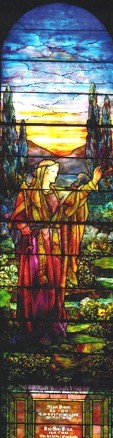
The Perfect Woman

The newest, and final of the Tiffany windows, this window dates from 1925, and was done at the time by the Tiffany studios when they were at their height. The artists at Tiffany didn't like the way that the flesh colored tones of the stained glass looked in windows so they painted the faces instead of using stained-glass. The window is dedicated to Stuart Brown and his wife, Kay Hay Brown, and given by their children. Mr. Brown was a prominent lawyer in Springfield. His grandfather, Stuart T. Brown, was a mentor of Abraham Lincoln.

The Perfect Woman is described in Proverbs 31. In full sun, the glow of light enhances the sunset effect of the scene, and Scripture verses below each name reflect the family's high esteem for their parents.

==== The Holy Spirit (Dove) Window ====
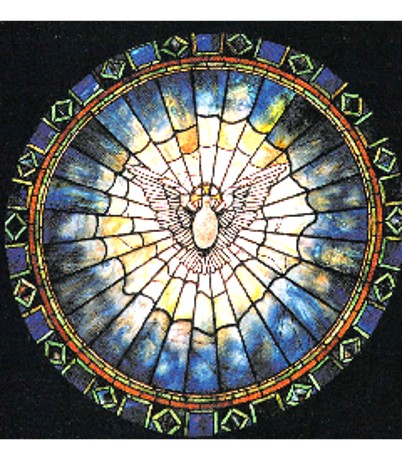
The Holy Spirit (Dove) Window

The location of the Dove window, near the ceiling's peak at the east (back) end of the sanctuary, allows the full brilliance of sunlight to stream through, and ministers have reported that the blaze of light on a bright morning offers them inspiration at the pulpit.

The only Tiffany window which was not commissioned by a family, but was done by the congregation for the congregation. Also, when the Brombaugh pipe organ was installed, the organ pipes were designed to fit around the Window. Tiffany craftsmen achieved a technically and structurally difficult effect in designing the Dove Window's circular pattern. They created visual depth by using up to three layers of glass in some places and the border sparkles with sapphire and emerald colored Tiffany jewel-like glass.

=== Other windows ===
The remaining windows in the Sanctuary are painted glass, rather than stained glass.

==== St. Elizabeth of Hungary ====
Created by the Pittsburgh Stained Glass Studios, under the direction of Howard G. Wilbert, the window serves as a memorial to Nancy Jane Mackie by her parents. Nancy died at age 26 and the design of the window depicts St. Elizabeth of Hungary who died at the age of 24. The window was dedicated in 1938. Sadly, Nancy's father, A.D. Mackie died less than a month after the dedication. Mr. Mackie was the president of Central Illinois Light Company (CILCO).

The featuring of a large, central figure would seem to indicate an intention to have the window fit harmoniously with the earlier Tiffany windows. Text at the top of window says, "I Go to Prepare a Place for You," and at the bottom of the window is "And a Little Child Shall Lead Them."

==== Plan of Salvation ====
As part of a major remodeling and redecoration project in the 1940s, Willet Studios designed a stained-glass program to enhance the "Gothic effect” of the church. This window, from 1945, gives the impression of ancient mosaics when viewed from a distance. The window was donated to the church by the widow of Harry P. Jones. Mr. Jones was an executive at Springfield's Franklin Life Insurance Company.

The window portrays Christ in three stages of his life: first as a baby, fulfilling God's promise to humankind; then his sacrifice on the cross; and finally, at the resurrection, surrounded by angels proclaiming his triumph. Smaller medallions around the central theme depict the early followers Peter, Paul, Luke, John, and Stephen. A vibrant ruby red, representing the sacrifice of Christ and the early Christians, reverberates throughout the piece.

==== The Ministry of Christ ====
Donated by the children of John Glen and Nellie Grant Miller, this window was also part of the remodeling of the Sanctuary in the 1940s. This window illustrates the Ministry of Christ through medallions depicting him in many roles: as the Good Shepherd, as forgiving Father, and as teacher, ever showing love for God's children and speaking with the disciples. At the bottom of the panel, St. Matthew (at left) and St. Mark (at right) symbolize both the human aspect of Christ's gospel and his royal lineage.

==== Window of Love and Brotherhood ====
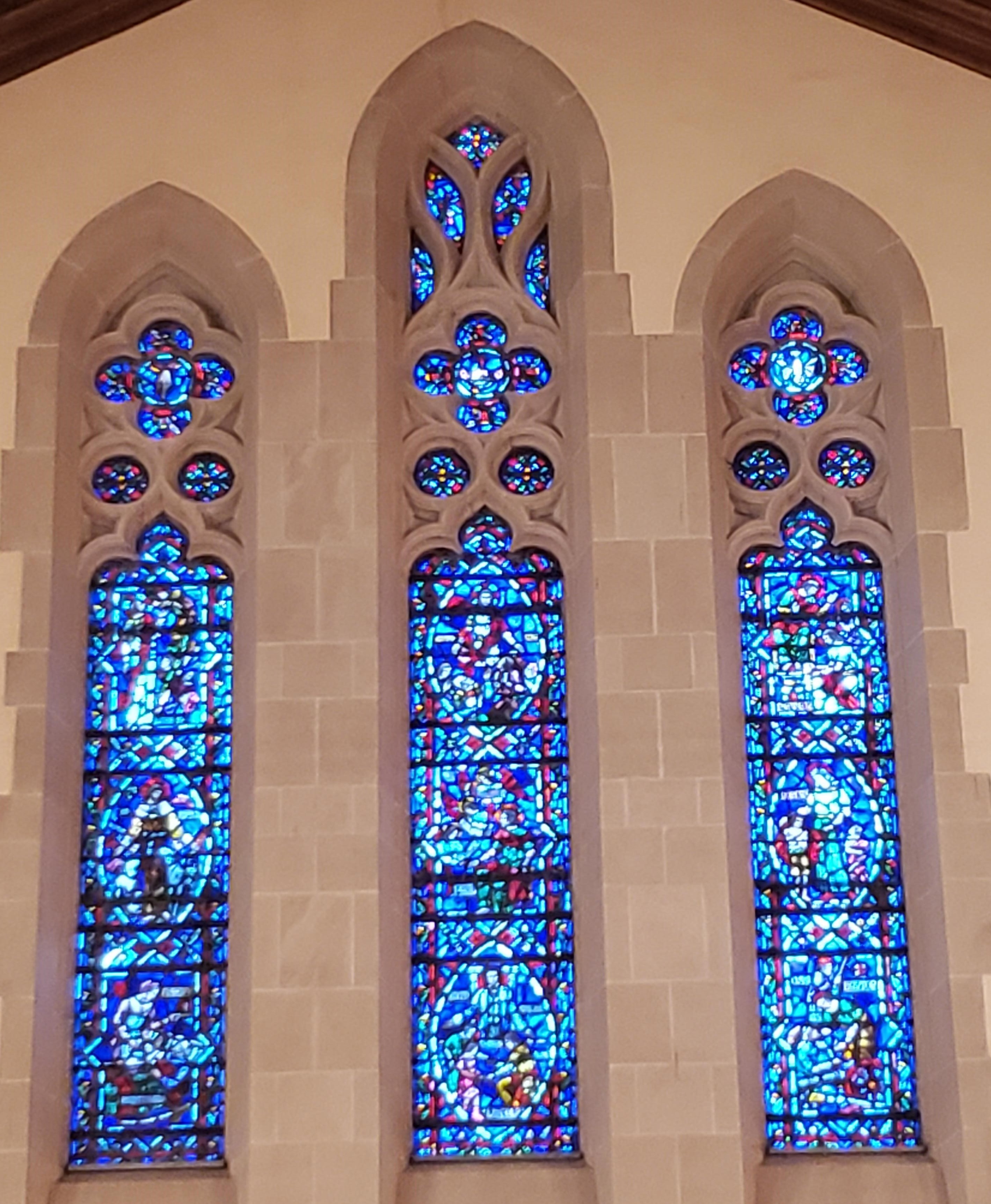
Window of Love and Brotherhood

In 1940, the church proceeded with a major remodeling and redecoration project, engaging architects to draw up a plan for the chancel area. Their design, Gothic in nature, featured a separation of the lectern and pulpit and the removal of the central organ pipes to enclosed recesses on the sides. This created the need for attractive windows above the chancel. In addition, the balcony at the back of the sanctuary had originally extended further over the pews, obstructing views of the two original side windows. The renovation included the removal of those extensions as well as a plan to coordinate those back windows with the ones over the chancel and those over the balcony, achieving a more harmonious Gothic effect.

This large piece, above the chancel, was installed in 1946. The windows create the impression of ancient mosaics when viewed from a distance. Designed by Willet Studios, it is made up of nine panels—three across and three down.

- The top row has depictions of Jesus preaching, working miracles, and washing the feet of his disciplines.
- The middle row shows St. Francis of Assisi blessing the animals, St. Paul composing his letter to the Corinthians, and Dorcas. Dorcas was a woman of means in the Bible and chose to use her wealth in service to the poor and widows.
- On the bottom row, in the middle you see a young Mr. Lincoln which is unusual because he was never baptized. The inscription reads, “with malice toward none” which was part of his second inaugural speech about one month prior to the end of the Civil War. Mr. Lincoln knew that the north was going to win the war and was looking for a way to provide healing to the country.
  - On the left-side is Florence Nightingale, who started what we know as the nursing profession, shown ministering to a soldier in the Crimean War.
  - On the right side is Clara Barton, founder of the American Red Cross, shown ministering to a soldier during the Civil War.

== Brombaugh pipe organ ==
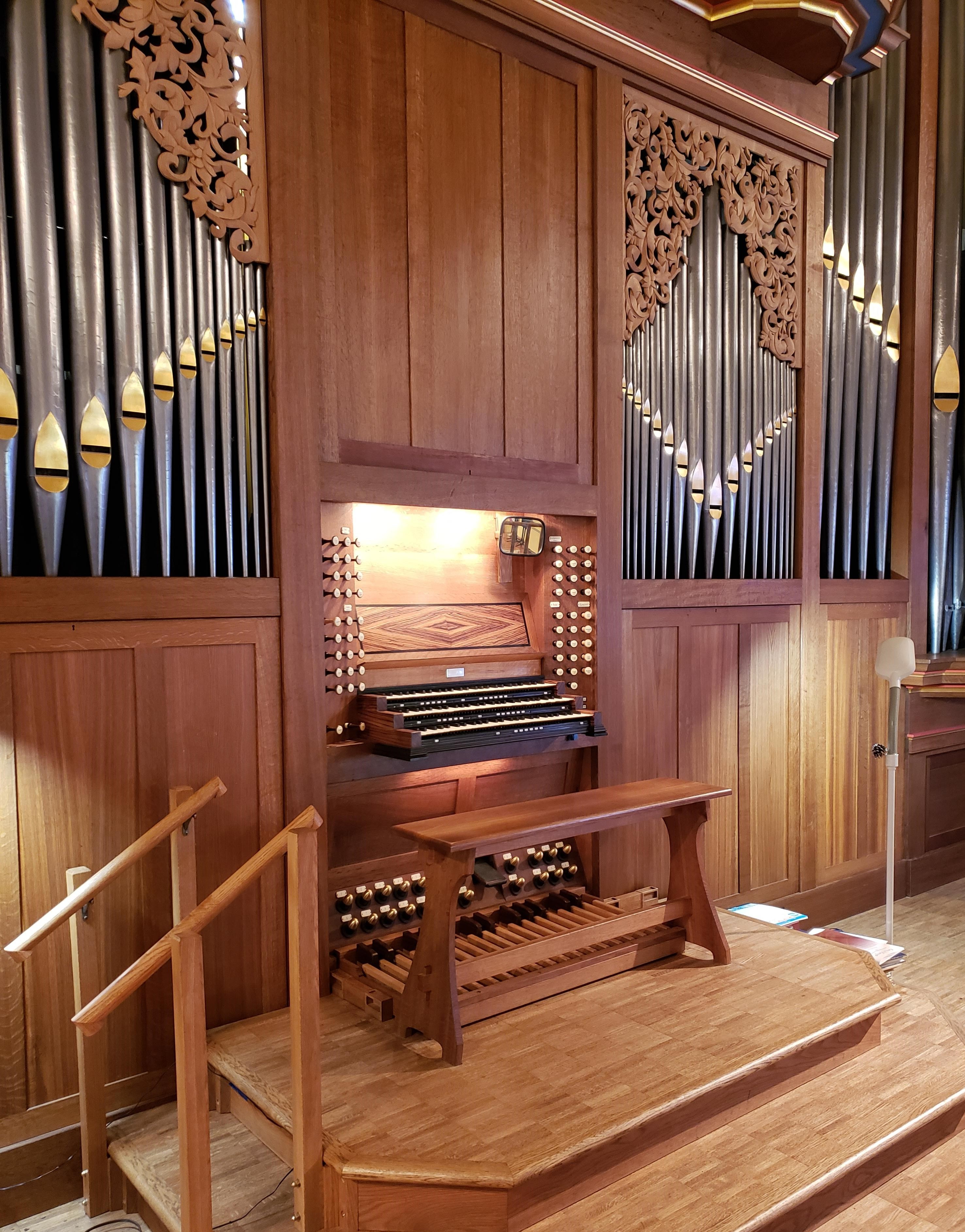
Brombaugh Opus 35 Console

In 1991, the church began discussions and exploration of a new sanctuary organ and in 1992 signed a contract with John Brombaugh & Associates of Eugene, Oregon. Construction of the new custom-made organ began in 1997.

In consultation with organist Dr. Rudy Zuiderveld and builder, John Brombaugh, the church approved an organ of three manual keyboards and pedalboard, with 46 stops and 3,240 pipes. The resulting organ is 30 feet long, 29 feet high and slightly less than a yard deep, with a smaller division of pipes, known as the "ruckpositive" located behind the organist on the front of the balcony. Brombaugh based the architecture of the organ case and its ornamentation on a late Renaissance style that was adapted to fit the First Presbyterian Church. One requirement was that the round Tiffany "Dove" stained glass window remain visible. The organ's surrounding facade is made of unfinished and oiled Appalachian white oak, with the mouths of all facade pipes gilded with 23-carat gold leaf.

Dedication took place at Pentecost 2001. Dr. Zuiderveld, organist for First Presbyterian Church since 1988 and professor of music at Illinois College, played hymns specifically commissioned for the dedication.
