= Sidney, Indiana =

- Town
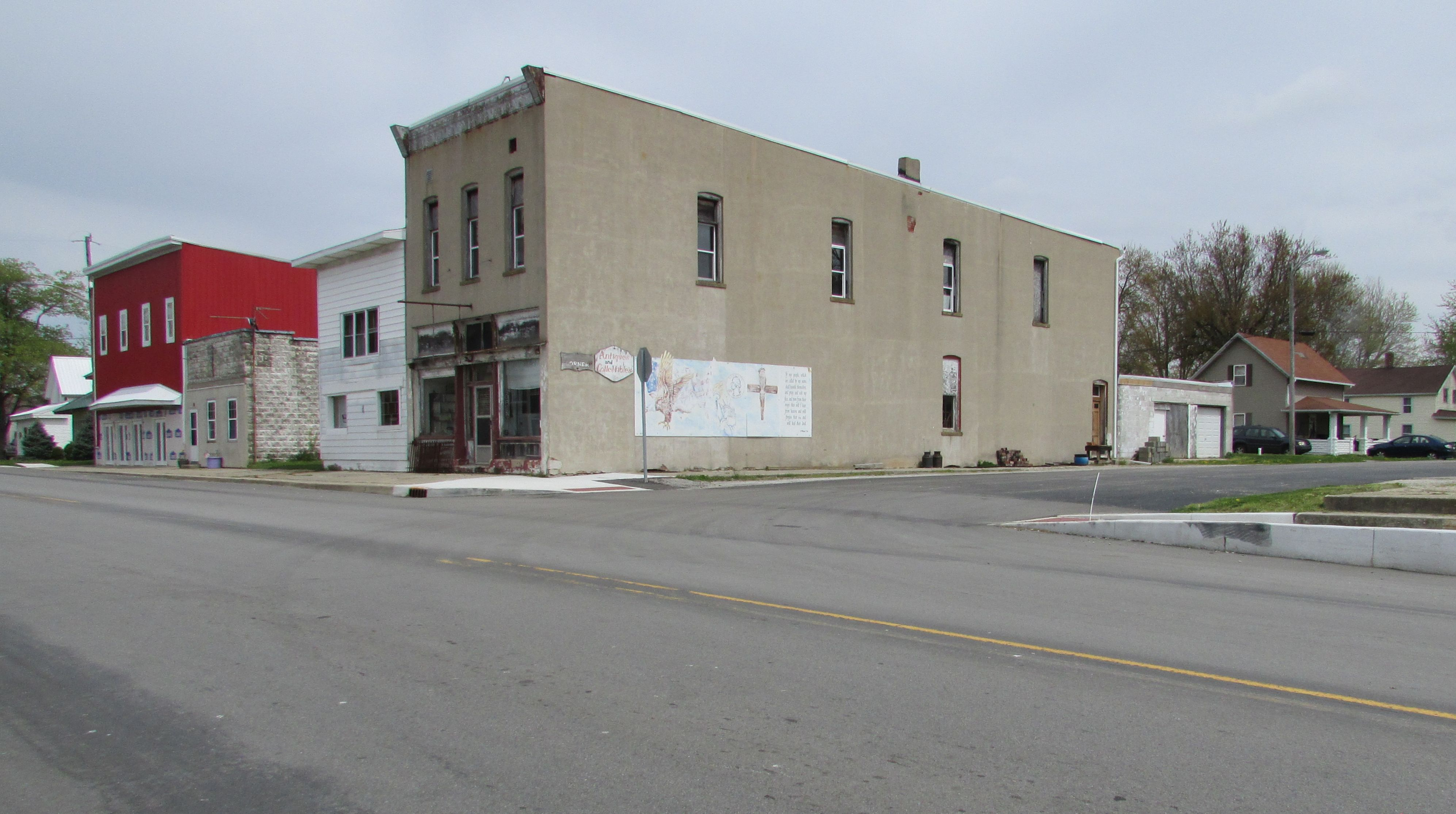
- North Main Street, Sidney, Indiana.

- Location of Sidney in Kosciusko County, Indiana.
- Coordinates: 41°06′18″N 85°44′32″W
- Country: United States
- State: Indiana
- County: Kosciusko
- Township: Jackson
- Platted: 1881
- Incorporated: 1914

Area
  - Total: 0.13 sq mi (0.33 km^{2})
  - Land: 0.12 sq mi (0.32 km^{2})
  - Water: 0.0039 sq mi (0.01 km^{2})
- Elevation: 912 ft (278 m)

Population (2020)
  - Total: 131
  - Density: 1,050.7/sq mi (405.68/km^{2})
- Time zone: UTC-5 (Eastern (EST))
  - Summer (DST): UTC-4 (EDT)
- ZIP code: 46566
- Area code: 260
- FIPS code: 18-69678
- GNIS feature ID: 2397662

Sidney is a town in Jackson Township, Kosciusko County, in the U.S. state of Indiana. The population was 131 at the 2020 census.

== History ==
Sidney was platted in the year 1881 when the railroad was extended to that point. The Sidney post office was established in 1882. Sidney was incorporated as a town in 1914.

== Geography ==
According to the 2010 census, Sidney has a total area of 0.125 square miles (0.32 km^{2}), of which 0.12 square miles (0.31 km^{2}) (or 96%) is land and 0.005 square miles (0.01 km^{2}) (or 4%) is water.

== Demographics ==
Historical population
Census	Pop.	Note	%±
1920	223		—
1930	182		−18.4%
1940	194		6.6%
1950	168		−13.4%
1960	208		23.8%
1970	179		−13.9%
1980	194		8.4%
1990	167		−13.9%
2000	168		0.6%
2010	83		−50.6%
2020	131		57.8%
U.S. Decennial Census

=== 2010 census ===
As of the census of 2010, there were 83 people, 34 households, and 25 families living in the town. The population density was 638.5 inhabitants per square mile (246.5/km^{2}). There were 41 housing units at an average density of 315.4 per square mile (121.8/km^{2}). The racial makeup of the town was 100.0% White. Hispanic or Latino of any race were 3.6% of the population.

There were 34 households, of which 35.3% had children under the age of 18 living with them, 58.8% were married couples living together, 8.8% had a female householder with no husband present, 5.9% had a male householder with no wife present, and 26.5% were non-families. 26.5% of all households were made up of individuals, and 17.6% had someone living alone who was 65 years of age or older. The average household size was 2.44 and the average family size was 2.84.

The median age in the town was 42.3 years. 25.3% of residents were under the age of 18; 4.7% were between the ages of 18 and 24; 26.4% were from 25 to 44; 20.4% were from 45 to 64; and 22.9% were 65 years of age or older. The gender makeup of the town was 45.8% male and 54.2% female.

=== 2000 census ===
As of the census of 2000, there were 168 people, 62 households, and 46 families living in the town. The population density was 1,291.2 inhabitants per square mile (498.5/km^{2}). There were 69 housing units at an average density of 530.3 per square mile (204.7/km^{2}). The racial makeup of the town was 98.21% White, 0.60% Pacific Islander, and 1.19% from two or more races. Hispanic or Latino of any race were 0.60% of the population.

There were 62 households, out of which 33.9% had children under the age of 18 living with them, 66.1% were married couples living together, 8.1% had a female householder with no husband present, and 24.2% were non-families. 21.0% of all households were made up of individuals, and 9.7% had someone living alone who was 65 years of age or older. The average household size was 2.71 and the average family size was 3.19.

In the town, the population was spread out, with 28.6% under the age of 18, 5.4% from 18 to 24, 29.8% from 25 to 44, 23.2% from 45 to 64, and 13.1% who were 65 years of age or older. The median age was 37 years. For every 100 females, there were 97.6 males. For every 100 females age 18 and over, there were 87.5 males.

The median income for a household in the town was $30,000, and the median income for a family was $37,500. Males had a median income of $25,000 versus $21,750 for females. The per capita income for the town was $14,959. About 10.9% of families and 8.6% of the population were below the poverty line, including 7.4% of those under the age of eighteen and 6.9% of those 65 or over.
