= Martin Grove Brumbaugh =

American politician

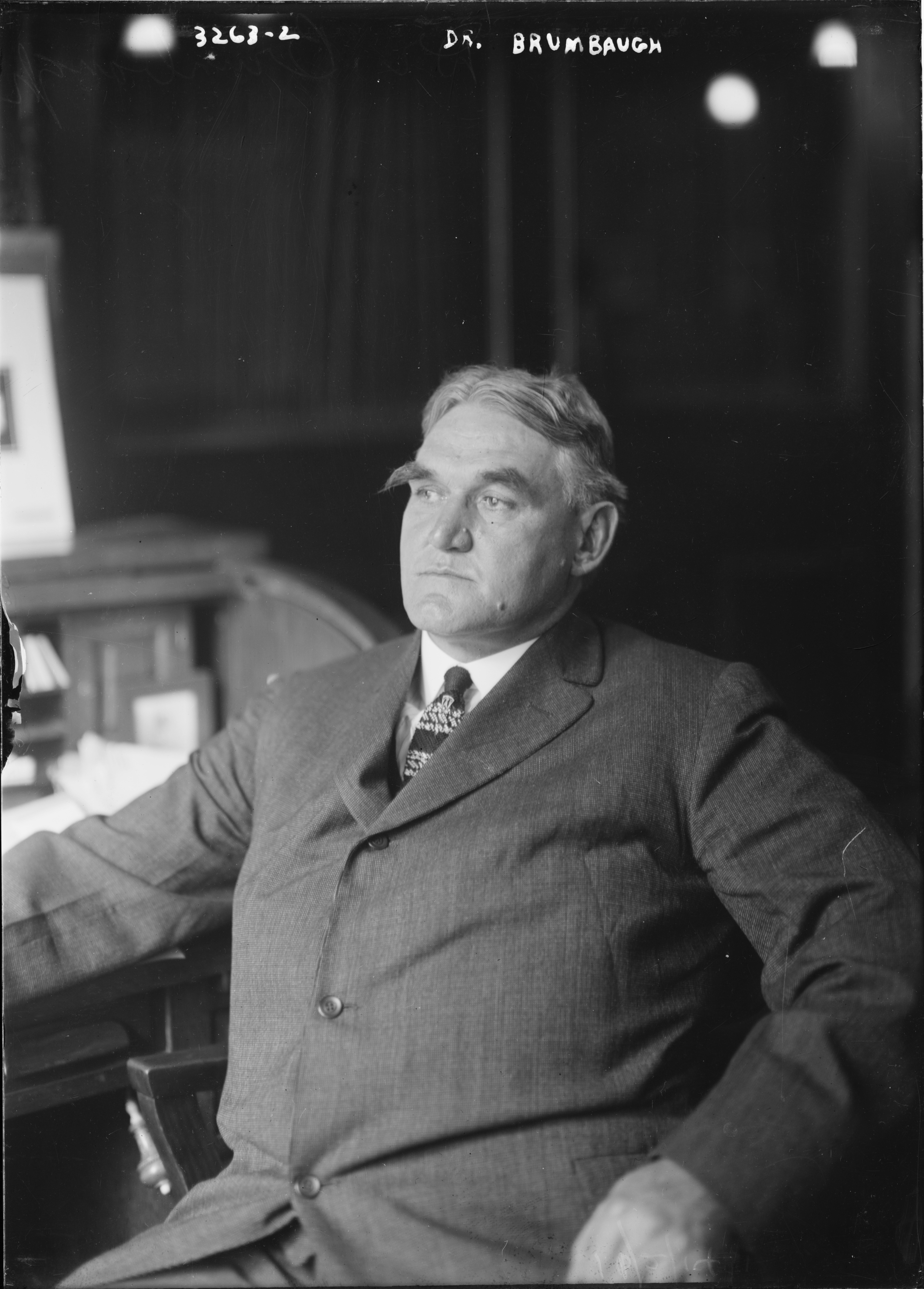
- Brumbaugh c. 1915

26th Governor of Pennsylvania
- In office January 19, 1915 – January 21, 1919
- Lieutenant: Frank McClain
- Preceded by: John Tener
- Succeeded by: William Sproul

Personal details
- Born: April 14, 1862 Penn Township, Huntingdon County, Pennsylvania
- Died: March 14, 1930 (aged 67) Pinehurst, North Carolina
- Party: Republican
- Spouse(s): Anna Konigmacher (m. 1884; died 1914) Flora Belle Parks (m. 1916)
- Children: 2
- Relatives: Martin A. Brumbaugh (nephew)
- Education: Huntingdon Normal School; University of Pennsylvania
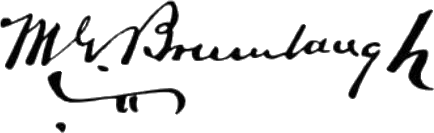
- Signature

Martin Grove Brumbaugh (April 14, 1862 – March 14, 1930) was an American politician who served as the 26th governor of Pennsylvania, from 1915 until 1919. He is frequently referred to as M.G. Brumbaugh, as was common among members of the Brumbaugh family. He also led education reform efforts in Puerto Rico after the U.S. took over from Spain after the Spanish-American War and in Pennsylvania.

== Early life ==
Brumbaugh was born in Huntingdon County, Pennsylvania, and raised in Woodcock Valley. He worked for his father, both on the family farm and Brumbaugh general store, and was raised in the German Baptist Brethren, popularly called Dunkers.

Brumbaugh attended Huntingdon Normal School (teacher training school) in Huntingdon, graduating in 1881. From 1884 until 1890, he was Superintendent of Huntingdon County schools. A voracious reader and researcher, Brumbaugh undertook postgraduate work at both Harvard and the University of Pennsylvania, earning degrees in mechanical engineering, philosophy, and the general sciences. He then obtained a Ph.D. from the University of Pennsylvania in 1894.

Brumbaugh married Anna Konigmacher, of Ephrata in 1884. He and Anna were the parents of two children, Edwin and Mabel. His wife died in 1914. He married Flora Belle Parks on January 29, 1916. His nephew was statistician Martin A. Brumbaugh.

== Career ==
Brumbaugh returned to work at Huntingdon Normal School (now renamed Juniata College) in 1895, where he stayed until 1910. Brumbaugh remained closely connected to the college, returning to become its president in 1926.

A leading proponent of educational modernization, Brumbaugh oversaw reform of the teacher training curriculum for the state of Louisiana. After the American invasion of Puerto Rico, then a wealthy overseas province of Spain, and the Treaty of Paris of 1899, Brumbaugh was charged with implementation of an American-style educational system in Puerto Rico.

Brumbaugh dissolved the entire Education Ministry that had been in place for centuries. Brumbaugh had the entire public school faculty, most of whom were trained professors of either Antillean or Peninsular Spanish origins, fired and deported. He then brought from the US Anglophone school teachers, including his cousin Dr. D. Brumbaugh, considered more "friendly to the American cause".

The American school teachers spoke only English while the island's primary language was Spanish, with some French and Italian speakers. In less than 18 months, school absenteeism shot up to 98% with the ensuing performance collapse of a population that spoke one language and the teachers another. Those children who did go to school were punished for speaking Spanish, and put down for their culture.

With the backing of the U'S. sponsored military government, Brumbaugh "Americanized" the entire curriculum. He re-wrote the Puerto Rican history curriculum, purged from it any data threatening to the "American cause". In addition, he began to edit and doctor data so as to exacerbate anything political or social by the former Spanish authorities, making it negative, out of context and proportion, in a national humiliation process that caused tremendous public outrage and protests. To this day, the island's educational system still suffers from Brumbaugh's "reforms". After he left Puerto Rico he held lecturer positions at the University of Pennsylvania and Harvard University. In 1906, he became superintendent of the Philadelphia Public Schools and gained statewide recognition for his performance in this role.

A conservative and religious but usually apolitical man, Brumbaugh was nevertheless courted by the Republican Party to run for governor in 1914, after corruption and infighting marred the 1910 campaign. While in office, Brumbaugh fought to expand educational funding, spur highway construction, and support farmers but also blocked labor reform and supported alcohol prohibition. During his term in office, he chided the state legislature for spending beyond its means and emphasized this point by vetoing 409 pieces of legislation. He received the largest share of the popular vote in the 1916 Republican Party presidential primaries.

Brumbaugh was an elected member of the American Philosophical Society. He was also president of the Pennsylvania German Society in 1927.

Brumbaugh died of a heart attack on March 14, 1930, while playing golf on vacation in Pinehurst, North Carolina.

== Legacy ==
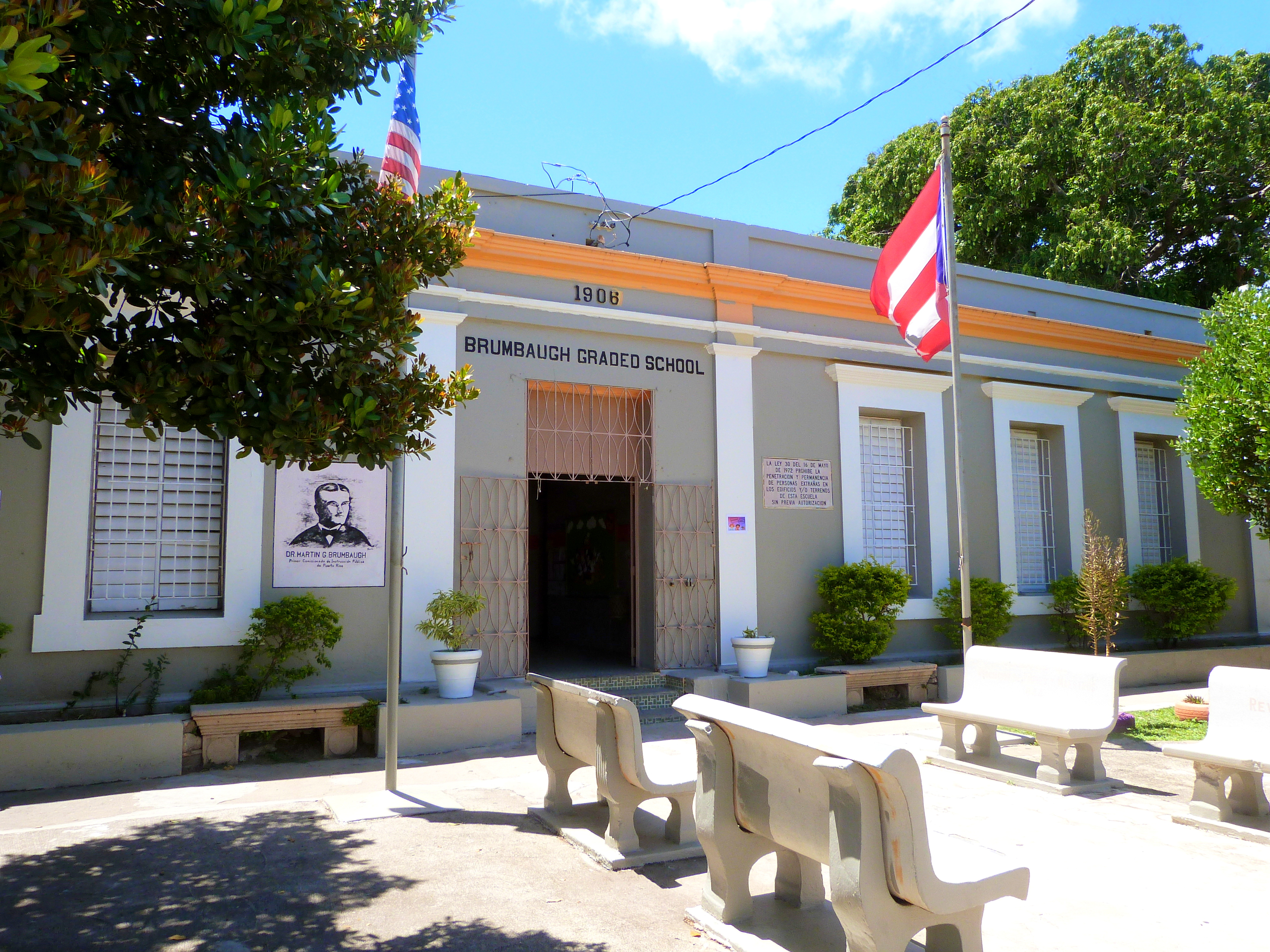
Escuela Dr. Martin G. Brumbaugh in Santa Isabel, Puerto Rico

Brumbaugh Hall is one of the 14 residence halls in the East Halls area of the Pennsylvania State University University Park campus, all named after Pennsylvania Governors. In the college town of Río Piedras, Puerto Rico, Calle Brumbaugh is a street named after Brumbaugh.

Two schools are named for him in Puerto Rico: the Dr. Martin G. Brumbaugh Graded School in Santa Isabel and the Escuela Brambaugh in San Juan. Both are listed on the National Register of Historic Places.

== Selected works ==
- Penn, William (1898). Brumbaugh, Martin Grove; Walton, Joseph Solomon (eds.). Penn's Frame of government of 1682 and Privileges and concessions of 1701. Philadelphia: C. Sower Company. LCCN 09013690 – via Internet Archive.
- Brumbaugh, Martin Grove (1899). A history of the German Baptist Brethren in Europe and America. Elgin, IL: Brethren Publishing House.
- Van Middeldyk, R. A. (1903). Brumbaugh, Martin Grove (ed.). The History of Puerto Rico – via Project Gutenberg.
- Brumbaugh, M. G. (1908). "The conditions in Germany about 1708". In Brumbaugh, Martin Grove; Falkenstein, G.N.; Miller, D.L.; Beahm, I.N.M.; McCann, S.N. (eds.). Two centuries of the Church of the Brethren, Or, The beginning of the brotherhood: Bicentennial addresses at the annual conference, held at Des Moines, Iowa, June 3–11, 1908. Elgin, IL: Brethren Publishing House. pp. 16–26.
- Schauffler, A. F.; Lamoreaux, Antoinette Abernethy; Brumbaugh, Martin G.; Lawrance, Marion (1908). Training the Teacher. Philadelphia: Sunday School Times Company – via Project Gutenberg.
- Brumbaugh, Martin G. (1908). The Life and Works of Christopher Dock – via Internet Archive. (incomplete version on Wikisource)
- Brumbaugh, Martin G. (1915). "Commencement address". Juniata College Bulletin. 12 (3a). Huntingdon, PA: Juniata College – via Internet Archive.

Educational offices
Preceded by Edward Brooks	School District of Philadelphia Superintendent; 1906–1914	Succeeded by John P. Garber
Political offices
Preceded by John Tener	Governor of Pennsylvania; 1915–1919	Succeeded by William Sproul
Party political offices
Preceded by John Tener	Republican nominee for Governor of Pennsylvania; 1914	Succeeded by William Sproul
