= Kimsey =

Kimsey is a surname. Notable people with the surname include:

- Chad Kimsey (1906–1942), American baseball player
- Chris Kimsey (born 1951), English record producer, mixer, and musician
- Jim Kimsey (1939–2016), co-founder, CEO, and first chairman of AOL
- Kevin M. Kimsey (1956–1987), American Navy personnel
- Lynn Kimsey, American entomologist and taxonomist
- Melbourne Kimsey (born 1930), American Air Force general
- Nathan Kimsey (born 1993), English golfer
- Rachel Kimsey (born 1978), American actress
- Rustin R. Kimsey (1935–2015), American Episcopal bishop
- Tim Kimsey, American audio engineer
- Todd Kimsey (1962–2016), American actor

== See also ==
- Kinsey (disambiguation)
