= Samuel Kinsey =

Christian minister (1832–1883)

Samuel Kinsey (25 May 1832 – 8 June 1883) was a Christian minister and leader of the reactionary wing of the German Baptist Brethren that became the Old German Baptist Brethren.

== Early life ==
Samuel Kinsey was born in Covington, Ohio on 25 May 1832 (Note: Brumbaugh (1913, p. 465) claims he was born on 26 May 1832) to Joel Kinsey and Elizabeth Brumbaugh. On 23 April 1852, he married Barbara Nead, daughter of Peter Nead, and together they had thirteen children. He joined the Brethren as a member in 1853. Kinsey was economically successful, and was at various times a carpenter, a farmer, proprietor of a general store, owner of a tree nursery, and publisher. The place where he lived became known as the town of Kinsey Station. He was a deacon and was elected in 1870 as a recognized minister of Lower Stillwater Brethren congregation in Randolph Township near Dayton, Ohio.

== Old Order leadership ==
Between 1851 and 1865, Brethren periodicals began to be published under progressive editors Henry Kurtz, James Quinter, and Henry Holsinger. At the same time, Kinsey's father-in-law, Peter Nead, was the primary leader for the reactionary wing of the Brethren, also known at the time as Old Order Brethren. Out of this group (Note: Other figures involved in starting the periodical included Daniel Miller, Abram Flory, Daniel P. Saylor, and Daniel Brower.) emerged a new periodical, The Vindicator, with Kinsey as editor. It was first published on 1 March 1870 as an eight-page monthly, composed of scriptural interpretations, exhortations to piety, and news on church affairs. One of its goals was to counter the influence of progressive Brethren periodicals.

A major controversy among the Brethren arose over the authority of tradition and the role of the church in establishing a church order or ordnung, known as the "order of the Brethren". In The Vindicator, Kinsey rejected that the church had any authority to change or adapt the order, as it was based upon Scripture. This view sharply contrasted with other Brethren at the time. The group that became the Church of the Brethren revered tradition and supported the role of the church in discerning an ordnung, but held this order to be changeable. Meanwhile, the faction that became the Brethren Church rejected any need for a unified church order or agreement on practices not explicitly defined in Christian scripture, and sought to eliminate some Brethren traditions which they felt lacked support from scriptures. (Note: Note that the values of individual liberty, the rejection of tradition, and secularization by diminishing the scope of the church's role are part of the philosophical movement of liberalism.)

In around 1874, Kinsey handed over control of his business interests to others in order to devote himself to the service of the church. He was a hymn writer. In 1878, Kinsey was one of four men appointed and financially supported by the Southern Ohio District of the Brethren to engage in missionary work in Kentucky. This work was largely unsuccessful.

A significant part of Kinsey's ministry was also his ongoing publishing. The Vindicator was expanded to 32 pages per issue. His work was not well received by the majority of Brethren; Kinsey was reprimanded by the 1881 Brethren Annual Meeting for encouraging dissension and criticizing church authorities. The Old German Baptist Brethren split at this conference, with Nead and Kinsey as their primary leaders. The proliferation of unauthorized and uncontrolled periodicals has been claimed as a major cause of this division. (Note: See also Miller (1882, p. 90), Dove (1932, p. 76f), Annual Meeting of 1869, Article 1, p. 342, and Annual Meeting of 1871, Article 35, p. 369) In 1882, at their first meeting, the Old German Baptist Brethren recognized The Vindicator as their official publication. Kinsey was also ordained as an elder in 1882.

== Death and legacy ==
Kinsey died on 8 June 1883. He was succeeded as editor by Joseph I. Cover. The Vindicator set a precedent of conservative periodicals that was followed by Mennonite George R. Brunk's Sword and Trumpet. (Note: See Bender, Harold S. (1959). "Sword and Trumpet, The". Mennonite Encyclopedia. Vol. 4. p. 677.) Kinsey has continued to be influential in the Old German Baptist Brethren. The Vindicator continues to be published for the Old German Baptist Brethren as of 2008.

== Works ==
- The pious companion.
- The parable of the supper.
- Forward and backward mode of baptism.
- Plain remarks on worldly mindedness.
- "Business Thoughts for Annual Meeting". The Vindicator. Vol. 9. June 1878. pp. 183–184.

== Citations ==
New creation	Editor of The Vindicator; 1 March 1870 – 8 June 1883	Succeeded by Joseph I. Cover
