= Martin A. Brumbaugh =

American statistician

Martin Allen Brumbaugh
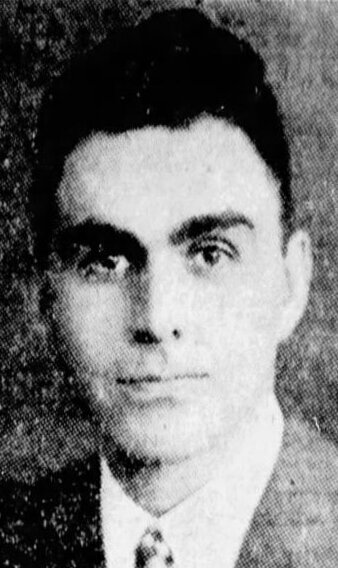
- Brumbaugh in a 1929 newspaper
- Education: Juniata College; University of Pennsylvania; Northwestern University
- Occupations: Economist; statistician; educator
- Relatives: Martin G. Brumbaugh (uncle)
- Awards: Shewhart Medal

Martin Allen Brumbaugh was an American statistician, economist and educator. He was a professor at the University of Pennsylvania and the University of Buffalo. He was a pioneer of statistical process control and a founding member of the American Society for Quality Control.

== Early life ==
Martin Allen Brumbaugh was born to Mary (née Haffley) and Irvin G. Brumbaugh. His father was a merchant in Pennsylvania and his uncle Martin G. Brumbaugh was Pennsylvania governor. He graduated from Juniata College in 1918. He attended post graduate courses at the University of Pennsylvania and Northwestern University. His 1926 dissertation at the University of Pennsylvania was entitled "Direct Method of Determining Cyclical Fluctuations of Economic Data".

== Career ==
In 1922, Brumbaugh became an assistant professor of economics and statistics at the Wharton School of the University of Pennsylvania. From 1926 to 1927, he was chief statistician of a study of conditions in Pennsylvania state and county institutions. In September 1929, he became a professor of statistics and economics at the School of Business Administration at the University of Buffalo. From 1928 to 1929, he was involved in surveying the worsted yarn industry for the spinners' division of the Wool Institute.

In 1929, Brumbaugh described the U.S. tax system as a "socialistic force" and was surging the inequality of incomes. In June 1931, Brumbaugh was appointed vice chairman of the Income and the Home Committee of President Herbert Hoover's Conference on Home Building and Home Ownership. In April 1933, he argued the Home Owners' Loan Corporation's bill would increase obligations on the home owner, instead of decreasing them, as the bill intended. In 1937, he was chairman of the housing committee of the Buffalo City Planning Association.

In September 1943, Brumbaugh taught alongside W. Edwards Deming, Holbrook Working, Andrew I. Peterson and Edwin G. Olds a one-week course entitled "Quality Control by Statistical Methods". In July 1944, he became editor and vice president of Industrial Quality Control, a bi-monthly publication by the Buffalo Society of Quality Control Engineers. He remained editor of the publication for three years. In 1946, he is credited with helping merge the Federation of Quality Control Societies, which included the Buffalo Society of Quality Control Engineers and the Industrial Quality Control publication, with the 13-member Society for Quality Control into the American Society for Quality Control. Following the merger, he continued his role as editor of Industrial Quality Control and became chair of the editorial board. He remained in these roles until April 1947. In 1950, he was elected as the first vice president of the society. He served as vice president until 1951.

In January 1947, Brumbaugh resigned from the University of Buffalo to become director of quality control of penicillin production and special assistant to vice president P. I. Bowman at Bristol Laboratories in Syracuse. By 1951, he was director of statistics at Bristol Laboratories.

In 1943, Brumbaugh was elected vice president of the Juniata College Alumni Association.

== Works ==
- Brumbaugh, Martin A. A Direct Method of Determining Cyclical Fluctuations of Economic Data
- Brumbaugh, Martin A., Riegel, Robert (1935) Study Problems in Business Statistics
- Brumbaugh, Martin A., Kellogg, Lester S. (1940) Business Statistics

== Personal life ==
Brumbaugh married. He had at least one daughter and son, Joan Elizabeth and James Irvin. He lived on Lincoln Park Drive in Syracuse.

== Awards and legacy ==
In 1948, the Martin A. Brumbaugh Award was named in his honor by the Rochester Society for Quality Control and was established as an annual award for the most valuable article published in Industrial Quality Control. The Brumbaugh Award continued in the succeeding publications to Industrial Quality Control, both Quality Progress and the Journal of Quality Technology. In 1950, he received the Shewhart Medal. In 1960, he became the third honorary member of the American Society for Quality Control.
