= Killing of Jonathan McKinsey =

2026 killing in Dublin, California

- Jonathan McKinsey
- Location: Dublin, California, U.S.
- Date: September 26, 2026; Approx. 3:00 pm (PDT)
- Attack type: Shooting
- Weapon: Gun
- Deaths: 1
- Victim: 1
- Accused: 2

On the afternoon of September 26, 2026, 40-year-old American man Jonathan McKinsey was fatally shot in Dublin, California, allegedly by his in-laws.

== Background ==
At the time of the shooting, McKinsey was working as a New York Times games engineering director. He had worked for the company since January 2023.

In 2025, McKinsey and his wife (who married in 2011) were involved in "a series of legal disputes," including reciprocal restraining orders and a divorce filing by McKinsey. McKinsey, a transgender man, alleged transphobic emotional and physical abuse at the hands of his wife and in-laws, who did not accept his gender identity. Alameda County prosecutors had separately charged McKinsey with two counts of misdemeanor child abuse in 2025; he pleaded not guilty to both charges.

== Incident ==
Around 3 p.m. on September 26, 2026, a Dublin Police Services sergeant spotted McKinsey lying in the parking lot of the Dublin Sports Grounds. Around the same time, 911 dispatchers received several calls about a shooting in the area. First responders pronounced McKinsey, who had multiple gunshot wounds, dead at the scene. Several witnesses told local media they had seen a masked man and woman shoot McKinsey; these accounts have not been confirmed by authorities.

== Investigation ==
Police arrested McKinsey's father-in-law and mother-in-law on suspicion of murder. Police searched the home of McKinsey's estranged wife on September 29, seizing a number of items. Police said there are no other outstanding suspects and no known threats to the public.

The suspects appeared in court on September 30. They were charged with felony murder, personal use of a firearm causing death, and lying in wait. The accused retained separate counsel. The lawyer for McKinsey's mother-in-law stated that she planned to plead not guilty.

On October 19, the suspects appeared again in court and pleaded not guilty. Outside the courthouse, the defense attorney for McKinsey's mother-in-law told reporters that McKinsey "had an extremely violent record", and alleged that he had threatened his client's life on several occasions.
