= Kinsey, Ohio =

Historic community in Montgomery County, Ohio

Kinsey is a historic community in Montgomery County, in the U.S. state of Ohio; its location, 39°51′14″N 84°17′34″W, makes it a neighborhood of Englewood.

== History ==
A post office called Kinseys Station was established in 1879, the name was changed to Kinsey in 1882, and the post office closed in 1904. The community was named for Samuel Kinsey, who operated a plant nursery near the station.
