= Bach Temperament =

Way J.S. Bach tuned his harpsichord

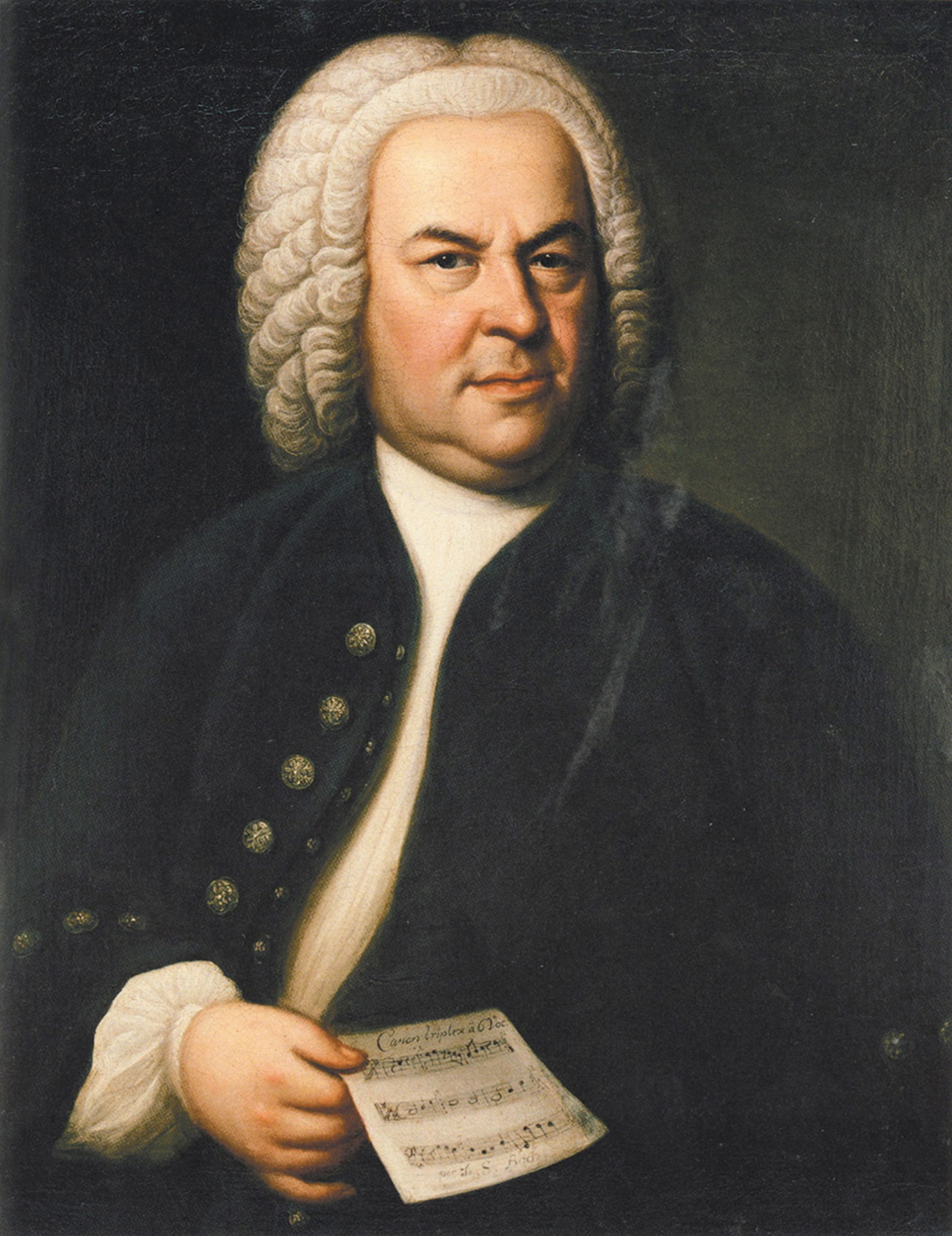
1748 portrait of J.S. Bach

A Bach Temperament refers to the way the composer Johann Sebastian Bach tuned his harpsichords and clavichords for the interpretation, among other pieces, of his masterpiece Das Wohltemperirte Clavier (1722 / 1740-1742).

There exists little certainty on how this temperament is structured. Bach did not leave written instructions on how he tuned. He was famous for tuning his keyboard in a swift and easy way, but it is not clear how. It should also be kept in mind that Bach's musical education was based on the meantone, the "dominating" keyboard tuning during the Baroque period (ca. 1600 to ca. 1750).

== Interpretations ==
The earliest known source for the tuning is the publication in 1753 of Versuch über die wahre Art das Clavier zu spielen by Carl Philipp Emanuel Bach. This work describes how to tune the fifths slightly different from purity, accompanied by an aural control of major and minor thirds, as well as full chords, so that all twenty-four keys sound clean and crisp, even to the highly trained ear. This method is purely auditory in nature, but Bach failed to prescribe an unambiguous description of his reconstruction of the meantone temperament.

There have been multiple attempts to rediscover Bach's intended tuning system.

Johann Kirnberger published Die Kunst des reinen Satzes in der Musik in 1771. As a student of Bach, he claims to follow Bach's teachings. However, this source also does not offer full certainty on how Bach tuned his keyboard.

Friedrich Wilhelm Marpurg published in 1776 Versuch über die musikalische Temperatur. He proposes that Bach used equal temperament (12TET). This hypothesis has been widely adopted in many publications, but the vast majority of scientific publications in this field no longer support this hypothesis since Kelletat (1960).

Johann Nikolaus Forkel published in 1802 Über Johann Sebastian Bach's Leben, Kunst und Kunstwerke. Forkel, a friend of Bach's sons and, therefore, an important source of information, also does not indicate exactly how Bach tuned the keyboard. Forkel knew from correspondence with Kirnberger that the latter did not agree with his former student Marpurg.

Robert Holford Macdowall Bosanquet (1876) questioned whether Bach would have applied the equal temperament.

Herbert Kelletat (1960) suggests that Kirnberger III, or a similar temperament, was Bach's temperament.

A. Sparschuh, a mathematician, was the first to propose a concrete hypothesis for a Bach tuning in 1998, based on a row of decorative curls above the title of Das Wohltemperirte Clavier. His initial hypothesis leads to an alternative diapason, is thus uncertain, and he subsequently has proposed a number of successive alternatives.

Harpsichordist Bradley Lehman published an alternative hypothesis in 2005, also based on the row of decorative curls above the title of Das wohltemperierte Klavier. In this way he constructed another possible tuning method. This idea also prompted others, such as John O'Donnell and John Francis, to adopt their own interpretation of the "curls", resulting in alternative temperaments.

The harpsichord manufacturer Jobin E. published in 2005 a hypothesis with two pure major thirds, and three unconventionally very slightly augmented fifths (those on A♭, E♭ and B♭). This configuration of fifths leads to a very good match of the characteristics of the fifths with the characteristics of the corresponding curls on the Bach figure. A temperament that is mathematically defined with the utmost precision and exhibits the smallest possible spread of diatonic impurities could also be a Bach temperament.

The precise definition of the Bach tuning still remains unclear. The only certainty has become that it must be "well-tempered", and preferably not the equal temperament.

== Bibliography ==
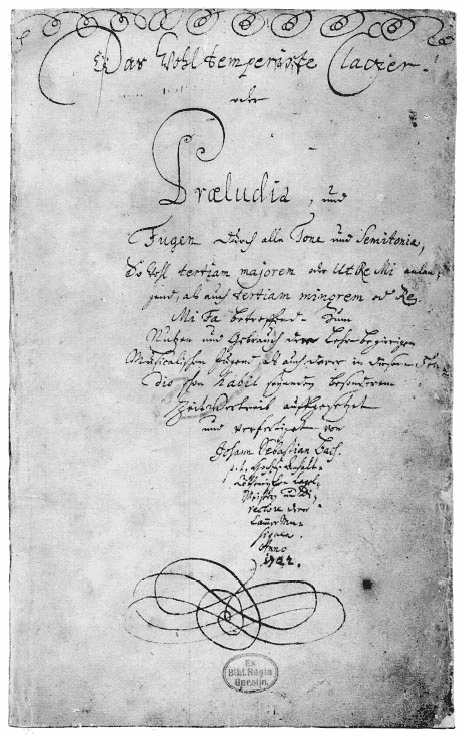
Scrolled drawing on top of the score of "Das Wohltemperierte Clavier"

- Bach C. Ph. E. (1753) : Versuch über die wahre Art das Clavier zu spielen. Enleitung. Pag. 10, § 14.
- Kirnberger J. (1771) : "Die Kunst des reinen Satzes in der Musik" (ISBN 3-48701-875-6). This book indicates which properties according to Bach were desirable for a good temperament, but not how these are concretely implemented according to Bach on the basis of tuning instructions.
- Marpurg F. (1776) : "Versuch über die musikalische Temperatur" (ISBN 0-36408-671-8). He suggests the equal temperament (12TET) was applied by Bach.
- Forkel J. N. (1802) : Über Johann Sebastian Bachs Leben, Kunst und Kunstwerke. Chapter III. Pag. 17.
- Kelletat H. (1966) : "Zur musikalischen Temperatur, I. Johann Sebastian Bach und seine Zeit" (1960, 1981, ISBN 3-87537-156-9). He suggests that Kirnberger III, or any similar temperament, or his own proposal (1966), could have been applied.
- Kellner H. (1977) : "Eine Rekonstruktion der wohltemperierten Stimmung von Johann Sebastian Bach" (Das Musikinstrument 26/1, p. 33–35).
- Barnes J. (1979–4)
- Billeter B. (1979) : "Anweisung zum Stimmen von Tasteninstrumenten in verschiedenen Temperaturen" (ISBN 3-87537-160-7).
- Lindley M. (1994) : "A Quest for Bach's Ideal Style of Organ Temperament" (M. Lustig, ed., Stimmungen im 17. und 18. Jahrhundert, Michaelstein, 1997)
- Sparschuh A. (1998) : "Stimm– Arithmetic des wohltemperierten Klaviers von J. S. Bach" (Deutsche Mathematiker Vereinigung, Jahrestagung 1999, Mainz, S. 154–155). This is probably the first approach to reconstruct a Bach–Temperament on the basis of a curled figure, drawn by J. S. Bach, at the top of a score of "Das Wohltemperirte Clavier", as shown in the figure above. He reworked his proposal in a series of varying interpretations.
- Jira M. (2000) : "Musikalische Temperaturen und Musikalischer Satz in der Klaviermusik von J. S. Bach" (2000, Hans Schneider – Tutzing, ISBN 3-79521-004-6).
- Zapf M. (2001) : harpsichord expert, "Handing down the Tradition: The survival of Bach's Finger Technique in an Obscure Nineteeht-Century Clavier Tutor". (De Clavicordio V, sept. 2001, p. 39-44), it is an updated proposal based on Sparschuh
- Francis J. C. (2004–6) : "The Keyboard Temperament of J. S. Bach" (Eunomios). Inspired by Sparschuh.
- Lehman B. (2005–2) : "Bach’s extraordinary temperament: our Rosetta Stone – 1; – 2" (Early Music, vol. 33, No 1, Feb 2005, p. 3-23; vol. 33, No 2, May 2005 p. 211-231). Inspired by an interpretation of the Bach curls, different from the interpretation by Sparschuh.
- Allain–Dupré P. (2005) : "Justesses et Tempéraments" (academis.edu) variant of the Lehman proposal
- Francis J. C. (2005–2) : "The Esoteric Keyboard Temperaments of J. S. Bach", New interpretation based on Sparschuh (Eunomios)
- Jencka D.: Letter to Early Music (2005–8, p. 545), a reply to Lehman
- Jobin E. (2005–8) : "BACH et le Clavier bien Tempéré" (website of "Clavecin en France"). Inspired on a new interpretation of the Bach scrolls, based on cent calculations.
- Maunder R. (2005–8) : Letter to Early Music (2005–8, p. 545–546), a reply to Lehman
- Mobbs K., MacKenzie A. (2005–8) : Letter to Early Music (2005–8, p. 546–547), a reply to Lehman
- Lucktenberg G. (2005–12) : short article "Light Reading for the Winter", in Newsletter of Southeastern Historical Keyboard Society (SEHKS),
- Francis J. C. (2005–7, 2006) : "Das Wohltemperirte Clavier, Pitch, Tuning and Temperament Design", a revision of his first proposal of 2004 (Eunomios)
- O'Donnell J. (2006–11) : "Bach's temperament, Occam's razor, and the Neidhardt factor" (Early Music, 2006–11, p. 625-633)
- Lindley M., Ortgies I. (2006–11) : "Bach style keyboard tuning" (Early Music, 2006–11, p. 613-623).
- Lehman B. (2006) : "Bach’s Art of Temperament" (BBC Music Magazine, August 2006 (Vol 14, #13), and fuller version on Lehman's website, LaripS.com)
- Spanyi M. (2006) : "Kirnberger's Temperament and its Use in Today's Musical Praxis" (Clavichord international – 11 (2007-5), 1, Seite 15–22)
- Interbartolo G., Venturino P. (2007-07) : ‘BACH 1722, "Il temperamento de Dio" (ISBN A000068628)
- Billeter B. (2008-3) : "Zur 'Wohltemperirten' Stimmung von Johann Sebastian Bach: Wie hat Bach seine Cembali gestimmt?" (Ars Organi Zeitschrift, 2008–3, p. 18-21).
- Di Veroli C. (2008–11) : "Unequal Temperaments: Theory, History and Practice" (e-book)
- Amiot E. (2008) : "Discrete Fourier Transform and Bach’s Good Temperament"
- Martinez Ruiz S. (2011) : "Temperament in Bach's Well-Tempered Clavier: A historical survey and a new evaluation according to dissonance theory" (Ph.D. dissertation, University of Barcelona, 2011)]
- Lehman B. (2022) : "The Notes Tell Us How to Tune", Bach: Journal of the Riemenschneider Bach Institute, Autumn 2022, Vol 53:02: 156-193. Examines the enharmonic requirements of all of Bach's keyboard pieces, showing that graphology arguments insufficiently probe the problems to be solved
