= Kadri Kimsen =

Estonian footballer

Personal information
- Date of birth: 8 October 1976 (age 50)
- Place of birth: Saue, Estonia
- Position: Midfielder

International career^{‡}
Years	Team	Apps	(Gls)
1994–2001	Estonia	10	(0)
- ‡ National team caps and goals as of 20:01, 11 February 2021 (UTC)

Kadri Kimsen (born 8 October 1976) is an Estonian former footballer who played as a midfielder for the Estonia women's national team.

== Career ==
Kimsen played in the first ever official match for Estonia, against Lithuania. In total, she played for the Estonia national team 10 times between 1994 and 2001, playing alongside her younger sister Kaire Kimsen on eight of those occasions. Kaire and Kadri Kimsen were the first pair of sisters to represent the Estonian national football team.

== Personal life ==
Her daughter, Marie Heleen Lisette Kikkas, is also an Estonian international footballer and debuted in December 2020.
