= Kinsey, Montana =

- Unincorporated community
- Location within Montana Location within the United States
- Coordinates: 46°34′15″N 105°39′25″W
- Country: United States
- State: Montana
- County: Custer
- Elevation: 2,313 ft (705 m)
- Time zone: UTC-7 (Mountain (MST))
  - Summer (DST): UTC-6 (MDT)
- ZIP code: 59338
- Area code: 406
- GNIS feature ID: 773063

Kinsey is an unincorporated community in Custer County, Montana, United States. Kinsey is located on Secondary Highway 489 near the Yellowstone River, 14.2 miles (22.9 km) northeast of Miles City. The community has a post office with ZIP code 59338.

The town name came from Jack Kinsey, who opened a post office in 1898.
