= Kaire Kimsen =

Estonian footballer

Personal information
- Date of birth: 13 March 1978 (age 48)
- Place of birth: Saue, Estonia
- Position: Defender

International career^{‡}
Years	Team	Apps	(Gls)
1996–2002	Estonia	17	(0)
- ‡ National team caps and goals as of 20:13, 11 February 2021 (UTC)

Kaire Kimsen (born 13 March 1978) is an Estonian former footballer who played as a defender for the Estonia women's national team.

== Career ==
Kimsen played for the Estonia national team 17 times between 1996 and 2002, competing alongside her older sister Kadri Kimsen on eight of those occasions. Kaire and Kadri Kimsen were the first pair of sisters to represent the Estonian national football team.

== Personal life ==
Her niece, Marie Heleen Lisette Kikkas, is also an Estonian international footballer and debuted in December 2020.
